Organ compositions by Johann Sebastian Bach refers to the compositions in the seventh chapter of the Bach-Werke-Verzeichnis (BWV, catalogue of Bach's compositions), or, in the New Bach Edition, the compositions in Series IV.

Six Sonatas (BWV 525–530)

 BWV 525 – Sonata No. 1 in E-flat major
 BWV 526 – Sonata No. 2 in C minor
 BWV 527 – Sonata No. 3 in D minor 
 BWV 528 – Sonata No. 4 in E minor 
 BWV 529 – Sonata No. 5 in C major 
 BWV 530 – Sonata No. 6 in G major

In the form of a Prelude, Toccata, Fantasia, Passacaglia, middle movement and/or Fugue (BWV 531–582)

 BWV 531 – Prelude and Fugue in C major
 BWV 532 – Prelude and Fugue in D major
 BWV 532a – Fugue in D major (alternative version of the fugue of BWV 532)
 BWV 533 – Prelude and Fugue in E minor ("Cathedral")
 BWV 533a – Prelude and Fugue in E minor (alternative version of BWV 533 without pedals)
 BWV 534 – Prelude and Fugue in F minor (doubtful)
 BWV 535 – Prelude and Fugue in G minor
 BWV 535a – Prelude and Fugue in G minor (alternative version of BWV 535)
 BWV 536 – Prelude and Fugue in A major
 BWV 536a – Prelude and Fugue in A major (alternative version of BWV 536, possibly based on the original manuscript)
 BWV 537 – Fantasia and Fugue in C minor
 BWV 538 – Toccata and Fugue in D minor ("Dorian")
 BWV 539 – Prelude and Fugue in D minor ("Fiddle") (uncertain)
 BWV 539a – Fugue in D minor (see BWV 1000 for the lute arrangement, movement 2 of BWV 1001 for the violin arrangement)
 BWV 540 – Toccata and Fugue in F major
 BWV 541 – Prelude and Fugue in G major
 BWV 542 – Fantasia and Fugue in G minor ("Great")
 BWV 542a – Fugue in G minor (alternative version of the fugue from BWV 542)
 BWV 543 – Prelude and Fugue in A minor
 BWV 544 – Prelude and Fugue in B minor
 BWV 545 – Prelude and Fugue in C major
 BWV 545a – Prelude and Fugue in C major (alternative version of BWV 545)
 BWV 545b – Prelude, Trio and Fugue in B-flat major (alternative version of BWV 545; the Trio is an arrangement of the finale of BWV 1029; some parts possibly by Johann Tobias Krebs)
 BWV 546 – Prelude and Fugue in C minor
 BWV 547 – Prelude and Fugue in C major ("9/8")
 BWV 548 – Prelude and Fugue in E minor ("Wedge")
 BWV 549 – Prelude and Fugue in C minor
 BWV 550 – Prelude and Fugue in G major
 BWV 551 – Prelude and Fugue in A minor
 BWV 552 – Prelude and Fugue in E-flat major ("St. Anne") (part of Clavier-Übung III)
 BWV 553 – Eight Short Preludes and Fugues – Prelude and Fugue in C major (spurious, possibly by Johann Tobias Krebs)
 BWV 554 – Eight Short Preludes and Fugues – Prelude and Fugue in D minor (spurious, possibly by Johann Tobias Krebs)
 BWV 555 – Eight Short Preludes and Fugues – Prelude and Fugue in E minor (spurious, possibly by Johann Tobias Krebs)
 BWV 556 – Eight Short Preludes and Fugues – Prelude and Fugue in F major (spurious, possibly by Johann Tobias Krebs)
 BWV 557 – Eight Short Preludes and Fugues – Prelude and Fugue in G major (spurious, possibly by Johann Tobias Krebs)
 BWV 558 – Eight Short Preludes and Fugues – Prelude and Fugue in G minor (spurious, possibly by Johann Tobias Krebs)
 BWV 559 – Eight Short Preludes and Fugues – Prelude and Fugue in A minor (spurious, possibly by Johann Tobias Krebs)
 BWV 560 – Eight Short Preludes and Fugues – Prelude and Fugue in B-flat major (spurious, possibly by Johann Tobias Krebs)
 BWV 561 – Fantasia and Fugue in A minor (spurious, possibly by Johann Christian Kittel)
 BWV 562 – Fantasia and Fugue in C minor (fugue unfinished)
 BWV 563 – Fantasia in B minor (Fantasia and Imitatio) (spurious)
 BWV 564 – Toccata, Adagio and Fugue in C major
 BWV 565 – Toccata and Fugue in D minor
 BWV 566 – Toccata and Fugue in E major (also published in C major)
 BWV 566a – Toccata in E major (earlier version of BWV 566)
 BWV 567 – Prelude in C major (possibly by Johann Ludwig Krebs)
 BWV 568 – Prelude in G major (doubtful)
 BWV 569 – Prelude in A minor
 BWV 570 – Fantasia in C major
 BWV 571 – Fantasia (Concerto) in G major (spurious)
 BWV 572 – Fantasia in G major (Pièce d'Orgue)
 BWV 573 – Fantasia in C major (incomplete, from the 1722 Notebook for Anna Magdalena Bach)
 BWV 574 – Fugue in C minor (on a theme of Legrenzi)
 BWV 574a – Fugue in C minor (alternative version of BWV 574)
 BWV 574b – Fugue in C minor (alternative version of BWV 574)
 BWV 575 – Fugue in C minor
 BWV 576 – Fugue in G major (doubtful)
 BWV 577 – Fugue in G major à la Gigue (doubtful)
 BWV 578 – Fugue in G minor ("Little")
 BWV 579 – Fugue in B minor (on a theme by Corelli, from Op. 3, No. 4)
 BWV 580 – Fugue in D major (doubtful)
 BWV 581 – Fugue in G major (not by Bach, composed by Gottfried August Homilius)
 BWV 582 – Passacaglia and Fugue in C minor

Trios (BWV 583–586)
 BWV 583 – Trio in D minor (spurious, possibly a transcription of a chamber trio by another composer)
 BWV 584 – Trio in G minor (spurious, a version of BWV 166/2 or another, lost, aria)
 BWV 585 – Trio in C minor (spurious, after Johann Friedrich Fasch)
 BWV 586 – Trio in G major (spurious, possibly after Georg Philipp Telemann)

Miscellaneous pieces (BWV 587–591)
 BWV 587 – Aria in F major (spurious, after François Couperin)
 BWV 588 – Canzona in D minor
 BWV 589 – Allabreve in D major
 BWV 590 – Pastorella in F major (first movement probably incomplete)
 BWV 591 – Little Harmonic Labyrinth (Kleines harmonisches Labyrinth) (spurious, possibly by Johann David Heinichen)

Concertos (BWV 592–597)

 BWV 592 – Concerto in G major (after a concerto by Prince Johann Ernst of Saxe-Weimar)
 BWV 592a – Concerto in G major (an arrangement of BWV 592 for harpsichord)
 BWV 593 – Concerto in A minor (after Antonio Vivaldi's Concerto for two violins, Op. 3 No. 8, RV 522)
 BWV 594 – Concerto in C major (after Antonio Vivaldi's Grosso mogul violin concerto, RV 208)
 BWV 595 – Concerto in C major (after a concerto by Prince Johann Ernst of Saxe-Weimar)
 BWV 596 – Concerto in D minor (after Antonio Vivaldi's Concerto for two violins and cello, Op. 3 No. 11, RV 565)
 BWV 597 – Concerto in E-flat major (doubtful)

Pedal exercise (BWV 598)
 BWV 598 – Pedal-Exercitium ("Pedal Exercise") in G minor (fragment, authorship uncertain, presumably by Carl Philipp Emanuel Bach)

Chorale Preludes

Traditionally known as chorale preludes, the compositions in the BWV 599–771 range of the Bach-Werke-Verzeichnis, and later additions BWV 1085, 1090–1120 (Neumeister Chorales) and 1128, are also indicated as chorale settings for organ, and include multi-movement chorale partitas and sets of variations.

Orgelbüchlein (Little Organ Book, BWV 599–644)

The Orgelbüchlein contains 46 chorale preludes, and a fragment (BWV Anh. 200).
 Advent
 BWV 599 – Nun komm, der Heiden Heiland
 BWV 600 – Gott durch deine Güte (or) Gottes Sohn ist kommen
 BWV 601 – Herr Christ, der ein'ge Gottes Sohn (or) Herr Gott, nun sei gepreiset (also in the Neumeister Collection)
 BWV 602 – Lob sei dem allmächtigen Gott
 Christmas

 New Year

 Epiphany

 Lent

 Easter

 Pentecost

 Catechism hymns

 Miscellaneous

Schübler Chorales (BWV 645–650)

Most of the Schübler Chorales, which were published around 1748 as Sechs Chorale von verschiedener Art (Six Chorales of Various Kinds), are transcriptions of extant cantata movements:
 BWV 645 – Wachet auf, ruft uns die Stimme
 BWV 646 – Wo soll ich fliehen hin (or) Auf meinen lieben Gott
 BWV 647 – Wer nur den lieben Gott läßt walten
 BWV 648 – Meine Seele erhebt den Herren
 BWV 649 – Ach, bleib bei uns, Herr Jesu Christ
 BWV 650 – Kommst du nun, Jesu, vom Himmel herunter

Great Eighteen Chorale Preludes, a.k.a. Leipzig Chorales (BWV 651–668)

 BWV 651 – Fantasia super: Komm, Heiliger Geist, Herre GottBWV 651a – Fantasia (Präludium) super: Komm, Heiliger Geist, Herre Gott (ältere, Weimarer Fassung)
 BWV 652 – Komm, Heiliger Geist, Herre GottBWV 652a – Komm, Heiliger Geist, Herre Gott (ältere, Weimarer Fassung)
 BWV 653 – An Wasserflüssen BabylonBWV 653a – An Wasserflüssen Babylon alio modo a 4 (ältere, Weimarer Fassung)BWV 653b – An Wasserflüssen Babylon (Weimarer Urfassung)
 BWV 654 – Schmücke dich, o liebe SeeleBWV 654a – Schmücke dich, o liebe Seele (ältere, Weimarer Fassung)
 BWV 655 – Trio super: Herr Jesu Christ, dich zu uns wendBWV 655a – Trio super: Herr Jesu Christ, dich zu uns wend (ältere, Weimarer Fassung)BWV 655b – Herr Jesu Christ, dich zu uns wendBWV 655c – Herr Jesu Christ, dich zu uns wend
 BWV 656 – O Lamm Gottes, unschuldigBWV 656a – O Lamm Gottes, unschuldig (ältere, Weimarer Fassung)
 BWV 657 – Nun danket alle Gott (Leuthen Chorale) (ältere Weimarer und Leipziger Fassung)
 BWV 658 – Von Gott will ich nicht lassenBWV 658a – Fantasia super: Von Gott will ich nicht lassen (ältere, Weimarer Fassung)
 BWV 659 – Nun komm, der Heiden HeilandBWV 659a – Fantasia super: Nun komm, der Heiden Heiland (ältere, Weimarer Fassung)
 BWV 660 – Trio super: Nun komm, der Heiden HeilandBWV 660a – Nun komm, der Heiden Heiland (ältere, Weimarer Fassung)BWV 660b – Nun komm, der Heiden Heiland
 BWV 661 – Nun komm, der Heiden HeilandBWV 661a – Nun komm, der Heiden Heiland (ältere, Weimarer Fassung)
 BWV 662 – Allein Gott in der Höh' sei Ehr'BWV 662a – Allein Gott in der Höh' sei Ehr' (ältere, Weimarer Fassung)
 BWV 663 – Allein Gott in der Höh' sei Ehr'BWV 663a – Allein Gott in der Höh' sei Ehr' (ältere, Weimarer Fassung)
 BWV 664 – Trio super: Allein Gott in der Höh' sei Ehr'BWV 664a/b – Trio super: Allein Gott in der Höh' sei Ehr' (ältere Weimarer Fassung/Entwurf)
 BWV 665 – Jesus Christus, unser HeilandBWV 665a – Jesus Christus, unser Heiland (in organo pleno) (ältere, Weimarer Fassung)
 BWV 666 – Jesus Christus, unser Heiland (alio modo)BWV 666a – Jesus Christus, unser Heiland (ältere, Weimarer Fassung)
 BWV 667 – Komm, Gott Schöpfer, heiliger GeistBWV 667a/b – Komm, Gott Schöpfer, heiliger Geist (ältere, Weimarer Fassungen)
 BWV 668 – Vor deinen Thron tret' ich (Fragment)BWV 668a – Wenn wir in höchsten Nöten sein (Diktatschrift: Fragment)

Chorale preludes in Clavier-Übung III (BWV 669–689)

Kyrie (three stanzas of "Kyrie, Gott Vater in Ewigkeit"):
 Two manuals and pedals:BWV 669 – Kyrie, Gott Vater in EwigkeitBWV 670 – Christe, aller Welt TrostBWV 671 – Kyrie, Gott heiliger Geist
 Manuals only:BWV 672 – Kyrie, Gott Vater in EwigkeitBWV 673 – Christe, aller Welt TrostBWV 674 – Kyrie, Gott heiliger Geist
"Allein Gott in der Höh' sei Ehr'" (Gloria):
 BWV 675 – Allein Gott in der Höh sei Ehr
 BWV 676 – Allein Gott in der Höh sei EhrBWV 676a – Allein Gott in der Höh sei Ehr (simplified variant of BWV 676: doubtful arrangement) 
 BWV 677 – Fughetta super: Allein Gott in der Höh sei Ehr (manuals only)
"Dies sind die heilgen zehn Gebot" (Ten Commandments):
 BWV 678 – Dies sind die heiligen zehen Gebot
 BWV 679 – Fughetta super: Dies sind die heiligen zehen Gebot (manuals only)
"Wir glauben all an einen Gott" (Credo):
 BWV 680 – Wir gläuben all an einen Gott
 BWV 681 – Fughetta super: Wir gläuben all an einen Gott (manuals only)
"Vater unser im Himmelreich" (Lord's Prayer):
 BWV 682 – Vater unser im Himmelreich
 BWV 683 – Vater unser im Himmelreich (manuals only)BWV 683a – Vater unser im Himmelreich (variant of BWV 683: doubtful arrangement)
"Christ unser Herr zum Jordan kam" (Baptism):
 BWV 684 – Christ unser Herr zum Jordan kam
 BWV 685 – Christ unser Herr zum Jordan kam (manuals only)
"Aus tiefer Not schrei ich zu dir" (Penitence):
 BWV 686 – Aus tiefer Not schrei ich zu dir
 BWV 687 – Aus tiefer Not schrei ich zu dir (manuals only)
"Jesus Christus, unser Heiland, der von uns den Zorn Gottes wandt" (Lord's Supper):
 BWV 688 – Jesus Christus, unser Heiland, der von uns den Zorn Gottes wandt
 BWV 689 – Fuga super: Jesus Christus, unser Heiland (manuals only)

24 chorale preludes, formerly known as "from the Kirnberger collection" (BWV 690–713)

The 24 chorale preludes and five variants published as "from the Kirnberger Collection" ("in Kirnberger's Sammlung") in the 40th volume of the Bach-Gesellschaft Ausgabe (1893) were all retained in the 690–713a range of the Bach-Werke-Verzeichnis. Johann Kirnberger's involvement with this collection of chorale preludes, some of which are spurious or doubtful, is however uncertain: modern scholarship no longer refers to this set as "Kirnberger Collection" (unless with qualifiers such as "so-called" or "formerly").
 BWV 690 – Wer nur den lieben Gott läßt walten
 BWV 691 – Wer nur den lieben Gott läßt walten (manuals only; No. 11 in the 1725 Notebook for Anna Magdalena Bach, No. 3 in the Klavierbüchlein für Wilhelm Friedemann Bach)BWV 691a – Wer nur den lieben Gott läßt walten (doubtful variant of BWV 691)
 BWV 692 – Ach, Gott und Herr (spurious: composed by Johann Gottfried Walther)BWV 692a – Ach, Gott und Herr (spurious early version of BWV 692: composed by Johann Gottfried Walther)
 BWV 693 – Ach, Gott und Herr (spurious: composed by Johann Gottfried Walther)
 BWV 694 – Wo soll ich fliehen hin
 BWV 695 – Fantasia super: Christ lag in Todesbanden (manuals only)BWV 695a – Christ lag in Todesbanden (doubtful variant of BWV 695)
 BWV 696 – Christum wir sollen loben schon (or) Was fürchtest du Feind, Herodes, sehr (fughetta; manuals only)
 BWV 697 – Gelobet seist du, Jesu Christ (fughetta; manuals only)
 BWV 698 – Herr Christ, der ein'ge Gottes-Sohn (fughetta; manuals only)
 BWV 699 – Nun komm, der Heiden Heiland (fughetta; manuals only)
 BWV 700 – Vom Himmel hoch, da komm' ich her
 BWV 701 – Vom Himmel hoch, da komm' ich her (fughetta, manuals only)
 BWV 702 – Das Jesulein soll doch mein Trost (fughetta)
 BWV 703 – Gottes-Sohn ist kommen (fughetta, manuals only)
 BWV 704 – Lob sei dem allmächtigen Gott (fughetta, manuals only)
 BWV 705 – Durch Adams Fall ist ganz verderbt
 BWV 706 – Liebster Jesu, wir sind hier
 BWV 707 – Ich hab' mein' Sach' Gott heimgestellt
 BWV 708 – Ich hab' mein' Sach' Gott heimgestelltBWV 708a – Ich hab' mein' Sach' Gott heimgestellt (variant of BWV 708)
 BWV 709 – Herr Jesu Christ, dich zu uns wend'
 BWV 710 – Wir Christenleut habn jetzund Freud
 BWV 711 – Allein Gott in der Höh' sei Ehr'
 BWV 712 – In dich hab' ich gehoffet, Herr (manuals only)
 BWV 713 – Jesu, meine Freude (manuals only)BWV 713a – Jesu, meine Freude (Fantasia, doubtful variant of BWV 713)

Miscellaneous chorale preludes (BWV 714–765)

 BWV 714 – Ach Gott und Herr (also in the Neumeister Collection)
 BWV 715 – Allein Gott in der Höh sei Ehr
 BWV 716 – Fuga super Allein Gott in der Höh sei Ehr
 BWV 717 – Allein Gott in der Höh sei Ehr'
 BWV 718 –   (chorale fantasia)
 BWV 719 – Der Tag, der ist so freudenreich (also in the Neumeister Collection)
 BWV 720 – Ein feste Burg ist unser Gott
 BWV 721 – Erbarm dich mein, o Herre Gott
 BWV 722 – Gelobet seist du, Jesu Christ
 BWV 723 – Gelobet seist du, Jesu Christ (also in the Neumeister Collection; likely by Johann Michael Bach)
 BWV 724 – Gott, durch deine Güte (Gottes Sohn ist kommen)
 BWV 725 – Herr Gott, dich loben wir
 BWV 726 – Herr Jesu Christ, dich zu uns wend
 BWV 727 – Herzlich tut mich verlangen
 BWV 728 – Jesus, meine Zuversicht (from the 1722 Notebook for Anna Magdalena Bach)
 BWV 729 – In dulci jubilo
 BWV 730 – Liebster Jesu, wir sind hier
 BWV 731 – Liebster Jesu, wir sind hier
 BWV 732 – Lobt Gott, ihr Christen, allzugleich
 BWV 733 – Fuga sopra il Magnificat (Meine Seele erhebt den Herren, a.k.a. German Magnificat – possibly composed by Bach's pupil Johann Ludwig Krebs)
 BWV 734 – Nun freut euch, lieben Christen/Es ist gewisslich an der Zeit
 BWV 735 – Valet will ich dir geben
 BWV 736 – Valet will ich dir geben
 BWV 737 – Vater unser im Himmelreich (also in the Neumeister Collection)
 BWV 738 – Von Himmel hoch, da komm' ich her
 BWV 738a – Von Himmel hoch, da komm' ich her
 BWV 739 – Wie schön leuchtet der Morgenstern
 BWV 740 – Wir glauben all' an einen Gott, Vater (spurious, partly attributed to Johann Tobias Krebs)
 BWV 741 – Ach Gott, von Himmel sieh' darein
 BWV 742 – Ach Herr, mich armen Sünder (also in the Neumeister Collection)
 BWV 743 – Ach, was ist doch unser Leben
 BWV 744 – Auf meinen lieben Gott (not by Bach, possibly by Johann Tobias Krebs)
 BWV 745 – Aus der Tiefe rufe ich (not by Bach, composed by Carl Philipp Emanuel Bach)
 BWV 746 – Christ ist erstanden (not by Bach, composed by Johann Caspar Ferdinand Fischer)
 BWV 747 – Christus, der uns selig macht
 BWV 748 – Gott der Vater wohn' uns bei (not by Bach, composed by Johann Gottfried Walther)
 BWV 748a – Gott der Vater wohn' uns bei
 BWV 749 – Herr Jesu Christ, dich zu uns wend' (attribution doubtful)
 BWV 750 – Herr Jesu Christ, mein's Lebens Licht (attribution doubtful)
 BWV 751 – In dulci jubilo (also in the Neumeister Collection; spurious: likely by Johann Michael Bach or possibly by Johann Gottfried Walther)
 BWV 752 – Jesu, der du meine Seele (attribution doubtful)
 BWV 753 – Jesu, meine Freude (incomplete)
 BWV 754 – Liebster Jesu, wir sind hier (attribution doubtful)
 BWV 755 – Nun freut euch, lieben Christen
 BWV 756 – Nun ruhen alle Wälder (attribution doubtful)
 BWV 757 – O Herre Gott, dein göttlich's Wort
 BWV 758 – O Vater, allmächtiger Gott
 BWV 759 – Schmücke dich, o liebe Seele (not by Bach, composed by Gottfried August Homilius)
 BWV 760 – Vater unser im Himmelreich (not by Bach, composed by Georg Böhm)
 BWV 761 – Vater unser im Himmelreich (not by Bach, composed by Georg Böhm)
 BWV 762 – Vater unser im Himmelreich (attribution doubtful)
 BWV 763 – Wie schön leuchtet der Morgenstern
 BWV 764 – Wie schön leuchtet der Morgenstern (incomplete)
 BWV 765 – Wir glauben all' an einen Gott

Chorale partitas (BWV 766–768)
 BWV 766 – Chorale partita Christ, der du bist der helle Tag
 BWV 767 – Chorale partita O Gott, du frommer Gott
 BWV 768 – Chorale partita Sei gegrüsset, Jesu gütig

Canonic Variations  

 BWV 769 – Canonic Variations on "Vom Himmel hoch da komm' ich her"
 BWV 769a – Canonic Variations on "Vom Himmel hoch da komm' ich her" (alternative version of BWV 769)

Chorale variations BWV 770-771 
 BWV 770 – Chorale variations "Ach, was soll ich Sünder machen"
 BWV 771 – Chorale variations "Allein Gott in der Höh' sei Ehr'" (not by Bach, possibly by Andreas Nicolaus Vetter)

Also known in a version for keyboard (BWV 957)

 BWV 957 – Machs mit mir, Gott, nach deiner Güt (chorale prelude for organ in the Neumeister Collection, previously listed as Fugue in G major)

Later additions to the BWV catalogue

Various (BWV 1085–1087)
 BWV 1085 – O Lamm Gottes, unschuldig (chorale prelude)
 Canons, sometimes indicated as organ pieces:
 BWV 1086 – Canon concordia discors
 BWV 1087 – 14 canons on the First Eight Notes of Goldberg Variations Ground (discovered 1974)

Neumeister Chorales (BWV 1090–1120)

31 chorale preludes for organ, discovered 1985 in the archives of the Yale University library.
 BWV 1090 – Wir Christenleut
 BWV 1091 – Das alte Jahr vergangen ist
 BWV 1092 – Herr Gott, nun schleuß den Himmel auf
 BWV 1093 – Herzliebster Jesu, was hast du verbrochen
 BWV 1094 – O Jesu, wie ist dein Gestalt
 BWV 1095 – O Lamm Gottes unschuldig
 BWV 1096 – Christe, der du bist Tag und Licht (or) Wir danken dir, Herr Jesu Christ (spurious: attributed to Johann Pachelbel)
 BWV 1097 – Ehre sei dir, Christe, der du leidest Not
 BWV 1098 – Erhalt uns, Herr, bei deinem Wort
 BWV 1099 – Aus tiefer Not schrei ich zu dir
 BWV 1100 – Allein zu dir, Herr Jesu Christ
 BWV 1101 – Durch Adams Fall ist ganz verderbt
 BWV 1102 – Du Friedefürst, Herr Jesu Christ
 BWV 1103 – Erhalt uns, Herr, bei deinem Wort
 BWV 1104 – Wenn dich Unglück tut greifen an
 BWV 1105 – Jesu, meine Freude
 BWV 1106 – Gott ist mein Heil, mein Hilf und Trost
 BWV 1107 – Jesu, meines Lebens Leben
 BWV 1108 – Als Jesus Christus in der Nacht
 BWV 1109 – Ach Gott, tu dich erbarmen
 BWV 1110 – O Herre Gott, dein göttlich Wort
 BWV 1111 – Nun lasset uns den Leib begrab'n
 BWV 1112 – Christus, der ist mein Leben
 BWV 1113 – Ich hab mein Sach Gott heimgestellt
 BWV 1114 – Herr Jesu Christ, du höchstes Gut
 BWV 1115 – Herzlich lieb hab ich dich, o Herr
 BWV 1116 – Was Gott tut, das ist wohlgetan
 BWV 1117 – Alle Menschen müssen sterben
 BWV 1118 – Werde munter, mein Gemüte
 BWV 1119 – Wie nach einer Wasserquelle
 BWV 1120 – Christ, der du bist der helle Tag

Recovered from the Anhang (BWV 1121 and 1128)
 BWV 1121 (=BWV Anh. 205) – Fantasie in C minor (organ)
 BWV 1128 (previously BWV Anh. 71) – Organ chorale fantasia Wo Gott der Herr nicht bei uns hält ( was authenticated as a composition by Bach after Wilhelm Rust's 1877 copy was recovered in March 2008).

Organ compositions in the seventh chapter of the Bach-Werke-Verzeichnis (1998)

|- id="Organ Sonatas BWV 525–530" style="background: #E3F6CE;"
| data-sort-value="0525.000" | 525
| data-sort-value="311.002" | 7.
| data-sort-value="1730-07-01" | 
| data-sort-value="Trio Sonata No. 1/6" | Trio Sonata No. 1/6
| E♭ maj.
| Organ
| data-sort-value="000.15: 003" | 15: 3
| data-sort-value="IV/07: 001" | IV/7: 1
| data-sort-value="→ BWV 0525a" | → BWV 525a
| 
|- style="background: #E3F6CE;"
| data-sort-value="0526.000" | 526
| data-sort-value="311.003" | 7.
| data-sort-value="1730-07-01" | 
| data-sort-value="Trio Sonata No. 2/6" | Trio Sonata No. 2/6
| C min.
| Organ
| data-sort-value="000.15: 013" | 15: 13
| data-sort-value="IV/07: 014" | IV/7: 14
| 
| 
|- style="background: #E3F6CE;"
| data-sort-value="0527.000" | 527
| data-sort-value="311.004" | 7.
| data-sort-value="1730-07-01" | 
| data-sort-value="Trio Sonata No. 3/6" | Trio Sonata No. 3/6 (+e. v. for /1)
| D min.
| Organ
| data-sort-value="000.15: 026" | 15: 26
| data-sort-value="IV/07: 028" | IV/7: 28
| → BWV 1044/2
| 
|- style="background: #E3F6CE;"
| data-sort-value="0528.000" | 528
| data-sort-value="312.001" | 7.
| data-sort-value="1730-07-01" | 
| data-sort-value="Trio Sonata No. 4/6" | Trio Sonata No. 4/6 (+e. v. for /2, /3)
| E min.
| Organ
| data-sort-value="000.15: 040" | 15: 40
| data-sort-value="IV/07: 044" | IV/7: 44
| data-sort-value="after BWV 0076/8" | after BWV 76/8
| 
|- style="background: #E3F6CE;"
| data-sort-value="0529.000" | 529
| data-sort-value="312.002" | 7.
| data-sort-value="1730-07-01" | 
| data-sort-value="Trio Sonata No. 5/6" | Trio Sonata No. 5/6 (+e. v. for /2)
| C maj.
| Organ
| data-sort-value="000.15: 050" | 15: 50
| data-sort-value="IV/07: 056" | IV/7: 56
| 
| 
|- style="background: #E3F6CE;"
| data-sort-value="0530.000" | 530
| data-sort-value="312.003" | 7.
| data-sort-value="1730-07-01" | 
| data-sort-value="Trio Sonata No. 6/6" | Trio Sonata No. 6/6
| G maj.
| Organ
| data-sort-value="000.15: 066" | 15: 66
| data-sort-value="IV/07: 076" | IV/7: 76
| 
| 
|- style="background: #F5F6CE;"
| data-sort-value="0531.000" | 531
| data-sort-value="313.001" | 7.
| data-sort-value="1701-12-31" | 
| Prelude and Fugue
| C maj.
| Organ
| data-sort-value="000.15: 081" | 15: 81
| data-sort-value="IV/05: 003" | IV/5: 3
| in Möllersche Handschrift 
| 
|-
| data-sort-value="0532.200" | 532.2
| data-sort-value="313.002" | 7.
| data-sort-value="1710-07-01" | 
| Prelude and Fugue
| D maj.
| Organ
| data-sort-value="000.15: 088" | 15: 88
| data-sort-value="IV/05: 058" | IV/5: 58
| data-sort-value="after BWV 0912/1" | after BWV 912/1, 532.1
| 
|-
| data-sort-value="0532.100" | 532.1
| data-sort-value="313.003" | 7.
| 
| Fugue (early version)
| D maj.
| Organ
|
| data-sort-value="IV/06: 095" | IV/6: 95
| data-sort-value="→ BWV 0532.2/2" | → BWV 532.2/2
| 
|- style="background: #F6E3CE;"
| data-sort-value="0533.000" | 533
| data-sort-value="313.004" | 7.
| data-sort-value="1704-07-01" | 1704
| Prelude and Fugue ("Cathedral")
| E min.
| Organ
| data-sort-value="000.15: 100" | 15: 100
| data-sort-value="IV/05: 090" | IV/5: 90
| data-sort-value="↔ BWV 0533a" | ↔ BWV 533a
| 
|-
| data-sort-value="0533.A00" | 533a
| data-sort-value="314.002" | 7.
| 
| Prelude and Fugue
| E min.
| Keyboard
| 
| data-sort-value="IV/06: 106" | IV/6: 106
| data-sort-value="↔ BWV 0533" | ↔ BWV 533
| 
|-
| data-sort-value="0534.000" | 534
| data-sort-value="314.003" | 7.
| data-sort-value="1714-12-31" | 1712–1717
| Prelude and Fugue
| F min.
| Organ
| data-sort-value="000.15: 104" | 15: 104
| data-sort-value="IV/05: 130" | IV/5: 130
| 
| 
|- style="background: #E3F6CE;"
| data-sort-value="0535.000" | 535
| data-sort-value="314.004" | 7.
| data-sort-value="1734-07-01" | after 1717
| Prelude and Fugue
| G min.
| Organ
| data-sort-value="000.15: 112" | 15: 112
| data-sort-value="IV/05: 157" | IV/5: 157
| data-sort-value="after BWV 0535a" | after BWV 535a
| 
|- style="background: #E3F6CE;"
| data-sort-value="0535.A00" | 535a
| data-sort-value="315.002" | 7.
| data-sort-value="1703-07-01" | 1702–1704
| Prelude and Fugue (incomplete)
| G min.
| Organ
| 
| data-sort-value="IV/06: 109" | IV/6: 109
| data-sort-value="→ BWV 0535" | → BWV 535; in Möllersche Handschrift 
| 
|- style="background: #F6E3CE;"
| data-sort-value="0536.000" | 536
| data-sort-value="315.003" | 7.
| data-sort-value="1712-12-31" | 1708–1717
| Prelude and Fugue
| A maj.
| Organ
| data-sort-value="000.15: 120" | 15: 120
| data-sort-value="IV/05: 180" | IV/5: 180
| data-sort-value="↔ BWV 0152/1" | ↔ BWV 152/1; → 536a
| 
|- style="background: #F6E3CE;"
| data-sort-value="0537.000" | 537
| data-sort-value="315.005" | 7.
| data-sort-value="1739-12-31" | 1729–1750
| Fantasia and Fugue
| C min.
| Organ
| data-sort-value="000.15: 129" | 15: 129
| data-sort-value="IV/05: 047" | IV/5: 47
| 
| 
|- style="background: #F6E3CE;"
| data-sort-value="0538.000" | 538
| data-sort-value="316.002" | 7.
| data-sort-value="1714-12-31" | 1712–1717
| Toccata and Fugue ("Dorian")
| D min.
| Organ
| data-sort-value="000.15: 136" | 15: 136
| data-sort-value="IV/05: 076" | IV/5: 76
| 
| 
|-
| data-sort-value="0539.000" | 539
| data-sort-value="316.003" | 7.
| data-sort-value="1736-07-01" | 1724–1750?
| Prelude and Fugue
| D min.
| Organ
| data-sort-value="000.15: 148" | 15: 148
| data-sort-value="IV/05: 070" | IV/5: 70
| after BWV 1001/2, 1000
| 
|- style="background: #F6E3CE;"
| data-sort-value="0540.000" | 540
| data-sort-value="317.001" | 7.
| data-sort-value="1714-12-31" | 1712–1717?
| Toccata and Fugue
| F maj.
| Organ
| data-sort-value="000.15: 154" | 15: 154
| data-sort-value="IV/05: 112" | IV/5: 112
| 
| 
|- style="background: #E3F6CE;"
| data-sort-value="0541.000" | 541528/3
| data-sort-value="317.002" | 7.
| data-sort-value="1714-12-31" | 1712–1717?
| Toccata and Fugue (Trio BWV 528/3 e. v. as possible middle movement)
| G maj.
| Organ
| data-sort-value="000.15: 169" | 15: 169
| data-sort-value="IV/05: 146" | IV/5: 146
| data-sort-value="→ BWV 0528/3" | → BWV 528/3
| 
|- style="background: #F6E3CE;"
| data-sort-value="0542.000" | 542
| data-sort-value="317.003" | 7.
| data-sort-value="1716-07-01" | 1714–1720?
| Fantasia and Fugue ("Great"; independent compositions?; fugue also in F minor)
| G min.
| Organ
| data-sort-value="000.15: 177" | 15: 177
| data-sort-value="IV/05: 167" | IV/5: 167
| 
| 
|- style="background: #F6E3CE;"
| data-sort-value="0543.000" | 543
| data-sort-value="318.002" | 7.
| data-sort-value="1740-07-01" | after 1730
| Prelude and Fugue
| A min.
| Organ
| data-sort-value="000.15: 189" | 15: 189
| data-sort-value="IV/05: 186" | IV/5: 186
| data-sort-value="after BWV 0543/1a" | after BWV 543/1a
| 
|- style="background: #F6E3CE;"
| data-sort-value="0543.A01" | 543/1a
| data-sort-value="318.003" | 7.
| data-sort-value="1720-07-01" | bef. 1725
| Prelude
| A min.
| Organ
| 
| data-sort-value="IV/06: 121" | IV/6: 121
| data-sort-value="→ BWV 0543/1" | → BWV 543/1
| 
|- style="background: #E3F6CE;"
| data-sort-value="0544.000" | 544
| data-sort-value="318.004" | 7.
| data-sort-value="1726-12-31" | 1725–1728
| Prelude and Fugue
| B min.
| Organ
| data-sort-value="000.15: 199" | 15: 199
| data-sort-value="IV/05: 198" | IV/5: 198
| 
| 
|- style="background: #F6E3CE;"
| data-sort-value="0545.000" | 545529/2
| data-sort-value="319.002" | 7.
| data-sort-value="1713-01-01" | 1708–1717after 1722
| Prelude and Fugue (middle movement BWV 529/2 e. v. removed after 1722)
| C maj.
| Organ
| data-sort-value="000.15: 212" | 15: 212
| data-sort-value="IV/05: 010" | IV/5: 10
| data-sort-value="after BWV 0545a" | after BWV 545a, b; → 529/2
| 
|-
| data-sort-value="0545.A00" | 545a
| data-sort-value="319.003" | 7.
| data-sort-value="1712-12-30" | 1708–1717
| Prelude and Fugue (early version)
| C maj.
| Organ
| 
| data-sort-value="IV/06: 077" | IV/6: 77
| data-sort-value="→  BWV 0545b" | → BWV 545b, 545
| 
|- style="background: #F6E3CE;"
| data-sort-value="0546.000" | 546
| data-sort-value="320.002" | 7.
| data-sort-value="1728-07-01" | 1708–1750
| Prelude and Fugue
| C min.
| Organ
| data-sort-value="000.15: 218" | 15: 218
| data-sort-value="IV/05: 035" | IV/5: 35
| 
| 
|- style="background: #F6E3CE;"
| data-sort-value="0547.000" | 547
| data-sort-value="320.003" | 7.
| data-sort-value="1734-12-31" | 1719–1750
| Prelude and Fugue
| C maj.
| Organ
| data-sort-value="000.15: 228" | 15: 228
| data-sort-value="IV/05: 020" | IV/5: 20
| 
| 
|- style="background: #E3F6CE;"
| data-sort-value="0548.000" | 548
| data-sort-value="320.004" | 7.
| data-sort-value="1726-12-31" | 1725–1728
| Prelude and Fugue ("Wedge")
| E min.
| Organ
| data-sort-value="000.15: 236" | 15: 236
| data-sort-value="IV/05: 094" | IV/5: 94
| 
| 
|-
| data-sort-value="0549.000" | 549
| data-sort-value="321.002" | 7.
| data-sort-value="1727-12-31" | 1705–1750
| Prelude and Fugue
| C min.
| Organ
| data-sort-value="000.38: 003" | 38: 3
| data-sort-value="IV/05: 030" | IV/5: 30
| data-sort-value="after  BWV 0549" | after BWV 549a
| 
|- style="background: #F5F6CE;"
| data-sort-value="0549.A00" | 549a
| data-sort-value="321.003" | 7.
| data-sort-value="1701-07-01" | 1701
| data-sort-value="Prelude or Fantasia and Fugue" | Prelude (or: Fantasia) and Fugue
| D min.
| Organ
| 
| data-sort-value="IV/06: 101" | IV/6: 101
| data-sort-value="→  BWV 0549" | → BWV 549; in Möllersche Handschrift 
| 
|- style="background: #E3F6CE;"
| data-sort-value="0550.000" | 550
| data-sort-value="321.004" | 7.
| data-sort-value="1707-07-01" | 1706–1708
| Prelude and Fugue
| G maj.
| Organ
| data-sort-value="000.38: 009" | 38: 9
| data-sort-value="IV/05: 138" | IV/5: 138
| 
| 
|-
| data-sort-value="0551.000" | 551
| data-sort-value="322.001" | 7.
| data-sort-value="1699-07-01" | 1699
| Prelude and Fugue
| A min.
| Organ
| data-sort-value="000.38: 017" | 38: 17
| data-sort-value="IV/06: 063" | IV/6: 63
| 
| 
|- id="NBA IV-4" style="background: #E3F6CE;"
| data-sort-value="0552.000" | 552
| data-sort-value="322.002" | 7.
| data-sort-value="1739-07-01" | 1739
| Prelude and Fugue ("St Anne")  from Clavier-Übung III
| E♭ maj.
| Organ
| data-sort-value="000.03: 173, 254" | 3: 173, 254
| data-sort-value="IV/04: 002, 105" | IV/4: 2, 105
| 
| 
|- style="background: #E3F6CE;"
| data-sort-value="0562.000" | 562
| data-sort-value="323.001" | 7.
| data-sort-value="1733-07-01" | 1720–1748
| Fantasia and Fugue (unfinished fugue added 1747–1748)
| C min.
| Organ
| data-sort-value="000.38: 064, 209" | 38: 64, 20944: 4
| data-sort-value="IV/05: 054" | IV/5: 54
| 
| 
|- style="background: #F5F6CE;"
| data-sort-value="0563.000" | 563
| data-sort-value="323.002" | 7.
| data-sort-value="1704-07-01" | 1704
| Fantasia and Imitatio
| C maj.
| Organ
| data-sort-value="000.38: 059" | 38: 59
| data-sort-value="IV/06: 068" | IV/6: 68
| in Andreas-Bach-Buch 
| 
|- style="background: #F6E3CE;"
| data-sort-value="0564.000" | 564
| data-sort-value="323.003" | 7.
| data-sort-value="1709-12-31" | bef. 1712
| Toccata, Adagio and Fugue
| C maj.
| Organ
| data-sort-value="000.15: 253" | 15: 253
| data-sort-value="IV/06: 003" | IV/6: 3
| 
| 
|-
| data-sort-value="0565.000" | 565
| data-sort-value="324.001" | 7.
| data-sort-value="1704-07-01" | 1704?
| Toccata and Fugue
| D min.
| Organ
| data-sort-value="000.15: 267" | 15: 267
| data-sort-value="IV/06: 031" | IV/6: 31
| 
| 
|- style="background: #F6E3CE;"
| data-sort-value="0566.000" | 566
| data-sort-value="324.002" | 7.
| data-sort-value="1724-07-01" | 1700–1750
| Prelude and Fugue (earliest manuscripts: C major; /1 as Toccata in BGA)
| E maj.C maj.
| Organ
| data-sort-value="000.15: 276" | 15: 276
| data-sort-value="IV/06: 040" | IV/6: 40
| 
| 
|-
| data-sort-value="0568.000" | 568
| data-sort-value="325.001" | 7.
| data-sort-value="1702-12-31" | 1700–1705?
| Prelude
| G maj.
| Organ
| data-sort-value="000.38: 85" | 38: 85
| data-sort-value="IV/06: 051" | IV/6: 51
| 
| 
|- style="background: #F6E3CE;"
| data-sort-value="0569.000" | 569
| data-sort-value="325.002" | 7.
| data-sort-value="1703-12-31" | 1703–1704
| Prelude
| A min.
| Organ
| data-sort-value="000.38: 089" | 38: 89
| data-sort-value="IV/06: 059" | IV/6: 59
| 
| 
|- id="BWV 1121" style="background: #E3F6CE;"
| 1121
| data-sort-value="325.003" | 7.
| data-sort-value="1707-07-01" | 1706–1710
| Fantasia
| C min.
| Organ
| 
| data-sort-value="IV/11: 054" | IV/11: 54
| in Andreas-Bach-Buch; was Anh. 205
| 
|- style="background: #F5F6CE;"
| data-sort-value="0570.000" | 570
| data-sort-value="326.001" | 7.
| data-sort-value="1700-07-01" | 1698–1704
| Fantasia
| C maj.
| Organ
| data-sort-value="000.38: 062" | 38: 62
| data-sort-value="IV/06: 016" | IV/6: 16
| in Andreas-Bach-Buch
| 
|- style="background: #F6E3CE;"
| data-sort-value="0572.000" | 572
| data-sort-value="326.003" | 7.
| data-sort-value="1709-07-01" | 1708–1712
| Fantasia, a.k.a. Pièce d'Orgue (+reworked version)
| G maj.
| Organ
| data-sort-value="000.38: 075" | 38: 75
| data-sort-value="IV/07: 130" | IV/7: 130, 144
| 
| 
|- style="background: #E3F6CE;"
| data-sort-value="0573.000" | 573
| data-sort-value="326.004" | 7.
| data-sort-value="1723-12-31" | 1722–1725
| data-sort-value="Notebook A. M. Bach (1722) No. 06" | Notebook A. M. Bach (1722) No. 6 Fantasia (incomplete?)
| C maj.
| Keyboard
| data-sort-value="000.38: 209" | 38: 209432: 3
| data-sort-value="V/04: 039" | V/4: 39IV/6: 18
| 
| 
|-
| data-sort-value="0574.000" | 574
| data-sort-value="327.002" | 7.
| data-sort-value="1728-07-01" | after 1708?
| Fugue on a theme by Legrenzi
| C min.
| Organ
| data-sort-value="000.38: 094" | 38: 94
| data-sort-value="IV/06: 019" | IV/6: 19
| data-sort-value="after BWV 0574b 574a" | after BWV 574b; ↔ 574a
| 
|- 
| data-sort-value="0574.A00" | 574a
| data-sort-value="327.003" | 7.
| data-sort-value="1728-07-01" | after 1708?
| Fugue on a theme by Legrenzi (variant)
| C min.
| Organ
| data-sort-value="000.38: 205" | 38: 205
| data-sort-value="IV/06: 082" | IV/6: 82
| data-sort-value="after BWV 0574b 574" | after BWV 574b; ↔ 574
| 
|- style="background: #F5F6CE;"
| data-sort-value="0574.B00" | 574b
| data-sort-value="327.004" | 7.
| data-sort-value="1708-12-31" | 1707–1713 or earlier
| Fugue on a theme by Legrenzi (early version)
| C min.
| Organ
| 
| data-sort-value="IV/06: 088" | IV/6: 88
| after Legrenzi (theme); → BWV 574a, 574; in Andreas-Bach-Buch
| 
|-
| data-sort-value="0575.000" | 575
| data-sort-value="327.005" | 7.
| data-sort-value="1712-12-30" | 1708–1717?
| Fugue
| C min.
| Organ
| data-sort-value="000.38: 101" | 38: 101
| data-sort-value="IV/06: 026" | IV/6: 26
| 
| 
|- style="background: #F5F6CE;"
| data-sort-value="0578.000" | 578
| data-sort-value="328.001" | 7.
| data-sort-value="1706-12-31" | 1713 or earlier
| Fugue ("Little")
| G min.
| Organ
| data-sort-value="000.38: 116" | 38: 116
| data-sort-value="IV/06: 055" | IV/6: 55
| in Andreas-Bach-Buch
| 
|- style="background: #F6E3CE;"
| data-sort-value="0579.000" | 579
| data-sort-value="328.002" | 7.
| data-sort-value="1712-12-30" | 1708–1717?
| Fugue on a theme by Corelli
| B min.
| Organ
| data-sort-value="000.38: 121" | 38: 121
| data-sort-value="IV/06: 071" | IV/6: 71
| after Corelli (theme)
| 
|- style="background: #F5F6CE;"
| data-sort-value="0582.000" | 582
| data-sort-value="328.005" | 7.
| data-sort-value="1703-12-30" | bef. 17071707–1708
| Passacaglia (and Fugue)
| C min.
| Organ
| data-sort-value="000.15: 289" | 15: 289
| data-sort-value="IV/07: 098" | IV/7: 98
| in Andreas-Bach-Buch
| 
|-
| data-sort-value="0583.000" | 583
| data-sort-value="329.002" | 7.
| data-sort-value="1730-07-01" | 1730 or earlier?
| Trio
| D min.
| Organ
| data-sort-value="000.38: 143" | 38: 143
| data-sort-value="IV/07: 094" | IV/7: 94
| 
| 
|-
| data-sort-value="0585.000" | 585
| data-sort-value="329.004" | 7.
| data-sort-value="1726-12-31" | 1726–1727 (JSB)
| Trio
| C min.
| Organ
| data-sort-value="000.38: 219" | 38: 219
| data-sort-value="IV/08: 073" | IV/8: 73
| after Fasch J. F., FaWV N:c2/1, /2; arr. by Bach
| 
|-
| data-sort-value="0586.000" | 586
| data-sort-value="329.005" | 7.
| data-sort-value="1720-12-31" | bef. 1740
| Trio
| G maj.
| Organ
| 
| data-sort-value="IV/08: 078" | IV/8: 78
| after Telemann?
| 
|-
| data-sort-value="0587.000" | 587
| data-sort-value="330.002" | 7.
| data-sort-value="1737-07-01" | after 1726
| Aria
| F maj.
| Organ
| data-sort-value="000.38: 222" | 38: 222
| data-sort-value="IV/08: 082" | IV/8: 82
| after Couperin, Les NationsIII/4
| 
|- style="background: #F5F6CE;"
| data-sort-value="0588.000" | 588
| data-sort-value="330.003" | 7.
| data-sort-value="1705-12-31" | 1704–1707 or earlier
| Canzona
| D min.
| Organ
| data-sort-value="000.38: 126" | 38: 126
| data-sort-value="IV/07: 118" | IV/7: 118
| in Möllersche Handschrift 
| 
|-
| data-sort-value="0589.000" | 589
| data-sort-value="330.004" | 7.
| data-sort-value="1709-07-01" | 1700–1720?
| Alla breve
| D maj.
| Organ
| data-sort-value="000.38: 131" | 38: 131
| data-sort-value="IV/07: 114" | IV/7: 114
|  
| 
|- style="background: #F6E3CE;"
| data-sort-value="0590.000" | 590
| data-sort-value="331.001" | 7.
| data-sort-value="1713-12-31" | bef. 1727
| Pastorella (/1 incomplete?)
| F maj.
| Organ
| data-sort-value="000.38: 135" | 38: 135
| data-sort-value="IV/07: 122" | IV/7: 122
| 
| 
|- style="background: #F6E3CE;"
| data-sort-value="0592.000" | 592
| data-sort-value="331.004" | 7.
| data-sort-value="1715-12-31" | 1714–1717
| Concerto for solo organ
| G maj.
| Organ
| data-sort-value="000.38: 149" | 38: 149
| data-sort-value="IV/08: 056" | IV/8: 56
| after J. E. of Saxe-Weimar, Concerto a 8; → BWV 592a
| 
|-
| data-sort-value="0592.A00" | 592a
| data-sort-value="331.005" | 7.
| data-sort-value="1715-12-31" | 1714–1717
| Concerto for solo harpsichord
| G maj.
| Keyboard
| data-sort-value="000.42: 282" | 42: 282
| V/11: 150
| data-sort-value="after BWV 0592" | after BWV 592
| 
|- style="background: #F5F6CE;"
| data-sort-value="0593.000" | 593
| data-sort-value="331.006" | 7.
| data-sort-value="1715-12-31" | 1714–1717
| Concerto for solo organ
| A min.
| Organ
| data-sort-value="000.38: 158" | 38: 158
| data-sort-value="IV/08: 016" | IV/8: 16
| data-sort-value="after Vivaldi, Op. 3 No. 08" | after Vivaldi, Op. 3 No. 8 (RV 522)
| 
|- style="background: #F5F6CE;"
| data-sort-value="0594.000" | 594
| data-sort-value="332.001" | 7.
| data-sort-value="1715-12-31" | 1714–1717
| Concerto for solo organ
| C maj.
| Organ
| data-sort-value="000.38: 171" | 38: 171
| data-sort-value="IV/08: 030" | IV/8: 30
| after Vivaldi, RV 208, Grosso Mogul
| 
|- 
| data-sort-value="0595.000" | 595
| data-sort-value="332.002" | 7.
| data-sort-value="1715-12-31" | 1714–1717
| Concerto for solo organ
| C maj.
| Organ
| data-sort-value="000.38: 196" | 38: 196
| data-sort-value="IV/08: 065" | IV/8: 65
| data-sort-value="after BWV 0984/1" | after BWV 984/1
| 
|- style="background: #E3F6CE;"
| data-sort-value="0596.000" | 596
| data-sort-value="332.003" | 7.
| data-sort-value="1715-12-31" | 1714–1717
| Concerto for solo organ (arrangement previously attributed to W. F. Bach)
| D min.
| Organ
| 
| data-sort-value="IV/08: 003" | IV/8: 3
| after Vivaldi, Op. 3 No. 11 (RV 565)
| 
|- style="background: #E3F6CE;"
| data-sort-value="0599.000" | 599
| data-sort-value="333.002" | 7.
| data-sort-value="1714-07-01" | 1713–1715 or earlier
| chorale setting "Nun komm, der Heiden Heiland" (Orgelbüchlein No. 1)
| A min.
| Organ
| data-sort-value="000.25 2: 002" | 252: 3
| data-sort-value="IV/01: 003" | IV/1: 3
| after Z 1174
| 
|- style="background: #E3F6CE;"
| data-sort-value="0600.000" rowspan="2" | 600
| data-sort-value="333.003" rowspan="2" | 7.
| data-sort-value="1714-07-01" rowspan="2" | 1713–1715 or earlier
| chorale setting "Gott durch deine Güte" (Orgelbüchlein No. 2)
| rowspan="2" | F maj.
| rowspan="2" | Organ
| data-sort-value="000.25 2: 003" rowspan="2" | 252: 4
| data-sort-value="IV/01: 004" rowspan="2" | IV/1: 4
| rowspan="2" | after Z 3294
| rowspan="2" | 
|- style="background: #E3F6CE;"
| chorale setting "Gottes Sohn ist kommen" (Orgelbüchlein No. 2)
|- style="background: #E3F6CE;"
| data-sort-value="0601.000" rowspan="2" | 601
| data-sort-value="333.004" rowspan="2" | 7.
| data-sort-value="1714-07-01" rowspan="2" | 1713–1715 or earlier
| chorale setting "Herr Christ, der ein'ge Gottes Sohn" (Orgelbüchlein No. 3; also in Neumeister Collection)
| rowspan="2" | A maj.
| rowspan="2" | Organ
| data-sort-value="000.25 2: 004" rowspan="2" | 252: 5
| data-sort-value="IV/01: 006" rowspan="2" | IV/1: 6
| rowspan="2" | after Z 4297a
| rowspan="2" | 
|- style="background: #E3F6CE;"
| chorale setting "Herr Gott, nun sei gepreiset" (Orgelbüchlein No. 3; also in Neumeister Collection)
|- style="background: #E3F6CE;"
| data-sort-value="0602.000" | 602
| data-sort-value="333.005" | 7.
| data-sort-value="1714-07-01" | 1713–1715 or earlier
| chorale setting "Lob sei dem allmächtigen Gott" (Orgelbüchlein No. 4)
| D min.
| Organ
| data-sort-value="000.25 2: 005" | 252: 6
| data-sort-value="IV/01: 007" | IV/1: 7
| data-sort-value="after Z 0339" | after Z 339
| 
|- style="background: #E3F6CE;"
| data-sort-value="0603.000" | 603
| data-sort-value="333.006" | 7.
| data-sort-value="1714-07-01" | 1713–1715 or earlier
| chorale setting "Puer natus in Bethlehem" (Orgelbüchlein No. 5)
| G min.
| Organ
| data-sort-value="000.25 2: 006" | 252: 6
| data-sort-value="IV/01: 008" | IV/1: 8
| data-sort-value="after Z 0192b" | after Z 192b
| 
|- style="background: #E3F6CE;"
| data-sort-value="0604.000" | 604
| data-sort-value="333.007" | 7.
| data-sort-value="1714-07-01" | 1713–1715 or earlier
| chorale setting "Gelobet seist du, Jesu Christ" (Orgelbüchlein No. 6)
| G maj.
| Organ
| data-sort-value="000.25 2: 007" | 252: 7
| data-sort-value="IV/01: 010" | IV/1: 11
| after Z 1947
| 
|- style="background: #E3F6CE;"
| data-sort-value="0605.000" | 605
| data-sort-value="333.008" | 7.
| data-sort-value="1714-07-01" | 1713–1715 or earlier
| chorale setting "Der Tag, der ist so freudenreich" (Orgelbüchlein No. 7)
| G maj.
| Organ
| data-sort-value="000.25 2: 008" | 252: 8
| data-sort-value="IV/01: 011" | IV/1: 11
| after Z 7870
| 
|- style="background: #E3F6CE;"
| data-sort-value="0606.000" | 606
| data-sort-value="333.009" | 7.
| data-sort-value="1714-07-01" | 1713–1715 or earlier
| chorale setting "Vom Himmel hoch, da komm ich her" (Orgelbüchlein No. 8)
| D maj.
| Organ
| data-sort-value="000.25 2: 009" | 252: 9
| data-sort-value="IV/01: 013" | IV/1: 13
| data-sort-value="after Z 0346" | after Z 346
| 
|- style="background: #E3F6CE;"
| data-sort-value="0607.000" | 607
| data-sort-value="333.010" | 7.
| data-sort-value="1714-07-01" | 1713–1715 or earlier
| chorale setting "Vom Himmel kam der Engel Schar" (Orgelbüchlein No. 9)
| G min.
| Organ
| data-sort-value="000.25 2: 010" | 252: 10
| data-sort-value="IV/01: 014" | IV/1: 14
| data-sort-value="after Z 0192a" | after Z 192a
| 
|- style="background: #E3F6CE;"
| data-sort-value="0608.000" | 608
| data-sort-value="334.001" | 7.
| data-sort-value="1714-07-01" | 1713–1715 or earlier
| chorale setting "In dulci jubilo" (Orgelbüchlein No. 10)
| A maj.
| Organ
| data-sort-value="000.25 2: 012" | 252: 12
| data-sort-value="IV/01: 016" | IV/1: 16
| after Z 4947
| 
|- style="background: #E3F6CE;"
| data-sort-value="0609.000" | 609
| data-sort-value="334.002" | 7.
| data-sort-value="1714-07-01" | 1713–1715 or earlier
| chorale setting "Lobt Gott, ihr Christen allzugleich" (Orgelbüchlein No. 11)
| G maj.
| Organ
| data-sort-value="000.25 2: 013" | 252: 13
| data-sort-value="IV/01: 018" | IV/1: 18
| data-sort-value="after Z 0198" | after Z 198
| 
|- style="background: #E3F6CE;"
| data-sort-value="0610.000" | 610
| data-sort-value="334.003" | 7.
| data-sort-value="1714-07-01" | 1713–1715 or earlier
| chorale setting "Jesu, meine Freude" (Orgelbüchlein" No. 12)
| C min.
| Organ
| data-sort-value="000.25 2: 014" | 252: 14
| data-sort-value="IV/01: 019" | IV/1: 19
| after Z 8032
| 
|- style="background: #E3F6CE;"
| data-sort-value="0611.000" | 611
| data-sort-value="334.004" | 7.
| data-sort-value="1714-07-01" | 1713–1715 or earlier
| chorale setting "Christum wir sollen loben schon" (Orgelbüchlein No. 13)
| E min.
| Organ
| data-sort-value="000.25 2: 015" | 252: 15
| data-sort-value="IV/01: 020" | IV/1: 20
| data-sort-value="after Z 0297c" | after Z 297c
| 
|- style="background: #E3F6CE;"
| data-sort-value="0612.000" | 612
| data-sort-value="334.005" | 7.
| data-sort-value="1714-07-01" | 1713–1715 or earlier
| chorale setting "Wir Christenleut" (Orgelbüchlein No. 14)
| G min.
| Organ
| data-sort-value="000.25 2: 016" | 252: 16
| data-sort-value="IV/01: 022" | IV/1: 22
| after Z 2072
| 
|- style="background: #E3F6CE;"
| data-sort-value="0613.000" | 613
| data-sort-value="334.006" | 7.
| data-sort-value="1736-07-01" | after 1724?
| chorale setting "Helft mir Gotts Güte preisen" (Orgelbüchlein No. 15)
| B min.
| Organ
| data-sort-value="000.25 2: 018" | 252: 18
| data-sort-value="IV/01: 024" | IV/1: 24
| after Z 5267
| 
|- style="background: #E3F6CE;"
| data-sort-value="0614.000" | 614
| data-sort-value="334.007" | 7.
| data-sort-value="1714-07-01" | 1713–1715 or earlier
| chorale setting "Das alte Jahr vergangen ist" (Orgelbüchlein No. 16)
| A min.
| Organ
| data-sort-value="000.25 2: 019" | 252: 19
| data-sort-value="IV/01: 025" | IV/1: 25
| data-sort-value="after Z 0381c" | after Z 381c
| 
|- style="background: #E3F6CE;"
| data-sort-value="0615.000" | 615
| data-sort-value="334.008" | 7.
| data-sort-value="1714-07-01" | 1713–1715 or earlier
| chorale setting "In dir ist Freude" (Orgelbüchlein No. 17)
| G maj.
| Organ
| data-sort-value="000.25 2: 020" | 252: 20
| data-sort-value="IV/01: 027" | IV/1: 27
| after Z 8537
| 
|- style="background: #E3F6CE;"
| data-sort-value="0616.000" | 616
| data-sort-value="334.009" | 7.
| data-sort-value="1714-07-01" | 1713–1715 or earlier
| chorale setting "Mit Fried und Freud ich fahr dahin" (Orgelbüchlein No. 18)
| D min.
| Organ
| data-sort-value="000.25 2: 024" | 252: 24
| data-sort-value="IV/01: 030" | IV/1: 30
| after Z 3986
| 
|- style="background: #E3F6CE;"
| data-sort-value="0617.000" | 617
| data-sort-value="334.010" | 7.
| data-sort-value="1714-07-01" | 1713–1715 or earlier
| chorale setting "Herr Gott, nun schleuß den Himmel auf" (Orgelbüchlein No. 19)
| A min.
| Organ
| data-sort-value="000.25 2: 026" | 252: 26
| data-sort-value="IV/01: 032" | IV/1: 32
| after Z 7641b
| 
|- style="background: #E3F6CE;"
| data-sort-value="0618.000" | 618
| data-sort-value="335.001" | 7.
| data-sort-value="1714-07-01" | 1713–1715 or earlier
| chorale setting "O Lamm Gottes, unschuldig" (Orgelbüchlein No. 20)
| F maj.
| Organ
| data-sort-value="000.25 2: 028" | 252: 28
| data-sort-value="IV/01: 034" | IV/1: 34
| after Z 4361a
| 
|- style="background: #E3F6CE;"
| data-sort-value="0619.000" | 619
| data-sort-value="335.002" | 7.
| data-sort-value="1714-07-01" | 1713–1715 or earlier
| chorale setting "Christe, du Lamm Gottes" (Orgelbüchlein No. 21)
| F maj.
| Organ
| data-sort-value="000.25 2: 030" | 252: 30
| data-sort-value="IV/01: 036" | IV/1: 36
| data-sort-value="after Z 0058" | after Z 58
| 
|- style="background: #E3F6CE;"
| data-sort-value="0620.000" | 620
| data-sort-value="335.003" | 7.
| data-sort-value="1736-07-01" | after 1724?
| chorale setting "Christus, der uns selig macht" (Orgelbüchlein No. 22)
| A min.
| Organ
| data-sort-value="000.25 2: 031" | 252: 30
| data-sort-value="IV/01: 037" | IV/1: 37
| data-sort-value="after BWV 0620a" | after BWV 620a
| 
|- style="background: #E3F6CE;"
| data-sort-value="0620.A00" | 620a
| data-sort-value="335.004" | 7.
| data-sort-value="1714-07-01" | 1713–1715 or earlier
| chorale setting "Christus, der uns selig macht" (Orgelbüchlein No. 22, e. v.)
| A min.
| Organ
| data-sort-value="000.25 2: 149" | 252: 149
| data-sort-value="IV/01: 078" | IV/1: 78
| after Z 6283b; → BWV 620
| 
|- style="background: #E3F6CE;"
| data-sort-value="0621.000" | 621
| data-sort-value="335.005" | 7.
| data-sort-value="1714-07-01" | 1713–1715 or earlier
| chorale setting "Da Jesus an dem Kreuze stund" (Orgelbüchlein No. 23)
| A min.
| Organ
| data-sort-value="000.25 2: 032" | 252: 32
| data-sort-value="IV/01: 039" | IV/1: 39
| after Z 1706
| 
|- style="background: #E3F6CE;"
| data-sort-value="0622.000" | 622
| data-sort-value="335.006" | 7.
| data-sort-value="1714-07-01" | 1713–1715 or earlier
| chorale setting "O Mensch, bewein dein Sünde groß" (Orgelbüchlein No. 24)
| E♭ maj.
| Organ
| data-sort-value="000.25 2: 033" | 252: 33
| data-sort-value="IV/01: 040" | IV/1: 40
| after Z 8303; → BWV 622 (var.)
| 
|-
| data-sort-value="0622.V00" | 622 (var.)
| data-sort-value="335.007" | 7.
| data-sort-value="1752-12-31" | 1716–1789
| chorale setting "O Mensch, bewein dein Sünde groß" (variant)
| 
| Organ
| 
| 
| data-sort-value="after BWV 0622" | after BWV 622
| 
|- style="background: #E3F6CE;"
| data-sort-value="0623.000" | 623
| data-sort-value="335.008" | 7.
| data-sort-value="1714-07-01" | 1713–1715 or earlier
| chorale setting "Wir danken dir, Herr Jesu Christ" (Orgelbüchlein No. 25)
| G maj.
| Organ
| data-sort-value="000.25 2: 035" | 252: 35
| data-sort-value="IV/01: 042" | IV/1: 42
| data-sort-value="after Z 0423" | after Z 423
| 
|- style="background: #E3F6CE;"
| data-sort-value="0624.000" | 624
| data-sort-value="335.009" | 7.
| data-sort-value="1714-07-01" | 1713–1715 or earlier
| chorale setting "Hilf Gott, dass mir's gelinge" (Orgelbüchlein No. 26)
| G min.
| Organ
| data-sort-value="000.25 2: 036" | 252: 36
| data-sort-value="IV/01: 044" | IV/1: 44
| after Z 4329
| 
|- style="background: #E3F6CE;"
| data-sort-value="0625.000" | 625
| data-sort-value="335.010" | 7.
| data-sort-value="1714-07-01" | 1713–1715 or earlier
| chorale setting "Christ lag in Todesbanden" (Orgelbüchlein No. 27)
| D min.
| Organ
| data-sort-value="000.25 2: 038" | 252: 38
| data-sort-value="IV/01: 046" | IV/1: 46
| after Z 7012a
| 
|- style="background: #E3F6CE;"
| data-sort-value="0626.000" | 626
| data-sort-value="335.011" | 7.
| data-sort-value="1714-07-01" | 1713–1715 or earlier
| chorale setting "Jesus Christus, unser Heiland, der den Tod überwand" (Orgelbüchlein No. 28)
| A min.
| Organ
| data-sort-value="000.25 2: 039" | 252: 39
| data-sort-value="IV/01: 048" | IV/1: 48
| after Z 1978
| 
|- style="background: #E3F6CE;"
| data-sort-value="0627.000" | 627
| data-sort-value="335.012" | 7.
| data-sort-value="1714-07-01" | 1713–1715 or earlier
| chorale setting "Christ ist erstanden" (Orgelbüchlein No. 29)
| D min.
| Organ
| data-sort-value="000.25 2: 040" | 252: 40
| data-sort-value="IV/01: 049" | IV/1: 49
| after Z 8584
| 
|- style="background: #E3F6CE;"
| data-sort-value="0628.000" | 628
| data-sort-value="336.001" | 7.
| data-sort-value="1714-07-01" | 1713–1715 or earlier
| chorale setting "Erstanden ist der heilge Christ" (Orgelbüchlein No. 30)
| D maj.
| Organ
| data-sort-value="000.25 2: 044" | 252: 44
| data-sort-value="IV/01: 054" | IV/1: 54
| after Z 1747a
| 
|- style="background: #E3F6CE;"
| data-sort-value="0629.000" | 629
| data-sort-value="336.002" | 7.
| data-sort-value="1714-07-01" | 1713–1715 or earlier
| chorale setting "Erschienen ist der herrliche Tag" (Orgelbüchlein No. 31)
| D min.
| Organ
| data-sort-value="000.25 2: 045" | 252: 45
| data-sort-value="IV/01: 055" | IV/1: 55
| after Z 1743
| 
|- style="background: #E3F6CE;"
| data-sort-value="0630.000" | 630
| data-sort-value="336.003" | 7.
| data-sort-value="1714-07-01" | 1713–1715 or earlier
| chorale setting "Heut triumphieret Gottes Sohn" (Orgelbüchlein No. 32)
| D min.
| Organ
| data-sort-value="000.25 2: 046" | 252: 46
| data-sort-value="IV/01: 056" | IV/1: 56
| data-sort-value="after BWV 0630a" | after BWV 630a
| 
|- style="background: #F6E3CE;"
| data-sort-value="0630.A00" | 630a
| data-sort-value="336.004" | 7.
| data-sort-value="1707-12-31" | bef. 1716
| chorale setting "Heut triumphieret Gottes Sohn" (Orgelbüchlein No. 32, e. v.)
| 
| Organ
| 
| data-sort-value="IV/01: 080" | IV/1: 80
| after Z 2585; → BWV 630
| 
|- style="background: #E3F6CE;"
| data-sort-value="0631.000" | 631
| data-sort-value="336.005" | 7.
| data-sort-value="1737-12-31" | 1723–1750
| chorale setting "Komm, Gott Schöpfer, heiliger Geist" (Orgelbüchlein No. 33)
| D min.
| Organ
| data-sort-value="000.25 2: 047" | 252: 47
| data-sort-value="IV/01: 058" | IV/1: 58
| data-sort-value="after BWV 0631a" | after BWV 631a
| 
|- style="background: #E3F6CE;"
| data-sort-value="0631.A00" | 631a
| data-sort-value="336.006" | 7.
| data-sort-value="1714-07-01" | 1713–1715 or earlier
| chorale setting "Komm, Gott Schöpfer, heiliger Geist" (Orgelbüchlein No. 33, e. v.)
| G maj.
| Organ
| data-sort-value="000.25 2: 150" | 252: 150
| data-sort-value="IV/01: 082" | IV/1: 82
| data-sort-value="after Z 0295" | after Z 295; → BWV 631
| 
|- style="background: #E3F6CE;"
| data-sort-value="0632.000" | 632
| data-sort-value="336.007" | 7.
| data-sort-value="1714-07-01" | 1713–1715 or earlier
| chorale setting "Herr Jesu Christ, dich zu uns wend" (Orgelbüchlein No. 34)
| F maj.
| Organ
| data-sort-value="000.25 2: 048" | 252: 48
| data-sort-value="IV/01: 059" | IV/1: 59
| data-sort-value="after Z 0624" | after Z 624
| 
|- style="background: #E3F6CE;"
| data-sort-value="0633.000" | 633
| data-sort-value="336.008" | 7.
| data-sort-value="1714-07-01" | 1713–1715 or earlier
| chorale setting "Liebster Jesu, wir sind hier" distinctus (Orgelbüchlein No. 36)
| A maj.
| Organ
| data-sort-value="000.25 2: 049" | 252: 49
| data-sort-value="IV/01: 061" | IV/1: 61
| data-sort-value="after BWV 0634" | after BWV 634
| 
|- style="background: #E3F6CE;"
| data-sort-value="0634.000" | 634
| data-sort-value="336.009" | 7.
| data-sort-value="1714-07-01" | 1713–1715 or earlier
| chorale setting "Liebster Jesu, wir sind hier" (Orgelbüchlein No. 35)
| A maj.
| Organ
| data-sort-value="000.25 2: 050" | 252: 50
| data-sort-value="IV/01: 060" | IV/1: 60
| after Z 3498b; → BWV 633
| 
|- style="background: #E3F6CE;"
| data-sort-value="0635.000" | 635
| data-sort-value="336.010" | 7.
| data-sort-value="1714-07-01" | 1713–1715 or earlier
| chorale setting "Dies sind die heilgen zehn Gebot" (Orgelbüchlein No. 37)
| C maj.
| Organ
| data-sort-value="000.25 2: 051" | 252: 50
| data-sort-value="IV/01: 062" | IV/1: 62
| after Z 1951
| 
|- style="background: #E3F6CE;"
| data-sort-value="0636.000" | 636
| data-sort-value="336.011" | 7.
| data-sort-value="1714-07-01" | 1713–1715 or earlier
| chorale setting "Vater unser im Himmelreich" (Orgelbüchlein No. 38)
| D min.
| Organ
| data-sort-value="000.25 2: 052" | 252: 52
| data-sort-value="IV/01: 064" | IV/1: 64
| after Z 2561
| 
|- style="background: #E3F6CE;"
| data-sort-value="0637.000" | 637
| data-sort-value="337.001" | 7.
| data-sort-value="1714-07-01" | 1713–1715 or earlier
| chorale setting "Durch Adams Fall ist ganz verderbt" (Orgelbüchlein No. 39)
| A min.
| Organ
| data-sort-value="000.25 2: 053" | 252: 53
| data-sort-value="IV/01: 065" | IV/1: 65
| after Z 7549
| 
|- style="background: #E3F6CE;"
| data-sort-value="0638.000" | 638
| data-sort-value="337.002" | 7.
| data-sort-value="1714-07-01" | 1713–1715 or earlier
| chorale setting "Es ist das Heil uns kommen her" (Orgelbüchlein No. 40)
| D maj.
| Organ
| data-sort-value="000.25 2: 054" | 252: 54
| data-sort-value="IV/01: 066" | IV/1: 66
| data-sort-value="after BWV 0638a" | after BWV 638a
| 
|- style="background: #F6E3CE;"
| data-sort-value="0638.A00" | 638a
| data-sort-value="337.003" | 7.
| data-sort-value="1706-07-01" | bef. 1715
| chorale setting "Es ist das Heil uns kommen her" (Orgelbüchlein No. 40, e. v.)
| 
| Organ
| 
| data-sort-value="IV/01: 083" | IV/1: 83
| after Z 4430; → BWV 638
| 
|- style="background: #E3F6CE;"
| data-sort-value="0639.000" | 639
| data-sort-value="337.004" | 7.
| data-sort-value="1714-07-01" | 1713–1715 or earlier
| chorale setting "Ich ruf zu dir, Herr Jesu Christ" (Orgelbüchlein No. 41; also in Neumeister Collection)
| F min.
| Organ
| data-sort-value="000.25 2: 055" | 252: 55
| data-sort-value="IV/01: 068" | IV/1: 68
| after Z 7400; → BWV Anh. 73
| 
|- style="background: #E3F6CE;"
| data-sort-value="0640.000" | 640
| data-sort-value="337.005" | 7.
| data-sort-value="1714-07-01" | 1713–1715 or earlier
| chorale setting "In dich hab ich gehoffet, Herr" (Orgelbüchlein No. 42)
| E min.
| Organ
| data-sort-value="000.25 2: 056" | 252: 56
| data-sort-value="IV/01: 070" | IV/1: 70
| after Z 2459
| 
|- style="background: #E3F6CE;"
| data-sort-value="0641.000" | 641
| data-sort-value="337.006" | 7.
| data-sort-value="1714-07-01" | 1713–1715 or earlier
| chorale setting "Wenn wir in höchsten Nöten sein" (Orgelbüchlein No. 43)
| G maj.
| Organ
| data-sort-value="000.25 2: 057" | 252: 57
| data-sort-value="IV/01: 071" | IV/1: 71
| data-sort-value="after Z 0394" | after Z 394
| 
|- style="background: #E3F6CE;"
| data-sort-value="0642.000" | 642
| data-sort-value="337.007" | 7.
| data-sort-value="1714-07-01" | 1713–1715 or earlier
| Chorale prelude Wer nur den lieben Gott lässt walten (Orgelbüchlein No. 44)
| A min.
| Organ
| data-sort-value="000.25 2: 058" | 252: 58
| data-sort-value="IV/01: 072" | IV/1: 72
| after Z 2778
| 
|- style="background: #E3F6CE;"
| data-sort-value="0643.000" | 643
| data-sort-value="337.008" | 7.
| data-sort-value="1714-07-01" | 1713–1715 or earlier
| chorale setting "Alle Menschen müssen sterben" (Orgelbüchlein No. 45)
| G maj.
| Organ
| data-sort-value="000.25 2: 059" | 252: 59
| data-sort-value="IV/01: 074" | IV/1: 74
| after Z 6779a
| 
|- style="background: #E3F6CE;"
| data-sort-value="0644.000" | 644
| data-sort-value="337.009" | 7.
| data-sort-value="1714-07-01" | 1713–1715 or earlier
| chorale setting "Ach wie nichtig, ach wie flüchtig" (Orgelbüchlein No. 46)
| G min.
| Organ
| data-sort-value="000.25 2: 060" | 252: 60
| data-sort-value="IV/01: 075" | IV/1: 75
| after Z 1887b
| 
|- style="background: #E3F6CE;"
| data-sort-value="0645.000" | 645
| data-sort-value="338.001" | 7.
| data-sort-value="1748-12-31" | 1748–1749
| chorale setting "Wachet auf, ruft uns die Stimme" (Schübler Chorales No. 1)
| E♭ maj.
| Organ
| data-sort-value="000.25 2: 063" | 252: 63
| data-sort-value="IV/01: 086" | IV/1: 86
| data-sort-value="after BWV 0140/4" | after BWV 140/4
| 
|- style="background: #E3F6CE;"
| data-sort-value="0646.000" rowspan="2" | 646
| data-sort-value="338.002" rowspan="2" | 7.
| data-sort-value="1748-12-31" rowspan="2" | 1748–1749
| chorale setting "Wo soll ich fliehen hin" (Schübler Chorales No. 2)
| rowspan="2" | E min.
| rowspan="2" | Organ
| data-sort-value="000.25 2: 066" rowspan="2" | 252: 66
| data-sort-value="IV/01: 090" rowspan="2" | IV/1: 90
| rowspan="2" | after Z 2164
| rowspan="2" | 
|- style="background: #E3F6CE;"
| chorale setting "Auf meinen lieben Gott" (Schübler Chorales No. 2)
|- style="background: #E3F6CE;"
| data-sort-value="0647.000" | 647
| data-sort-value="338.003" | 7.
| data-sort-value="1748-12-31" | 1748–1749
| chorale setting "Wer nur den lieben Gott lässt walten" (Schübler Chorales No. 3)
| C min.
| Organ
| data-sort-value="000.25 2: 068" | 252: 68
| data-sort-value="IV/01: 092" | IV/1: 92
| data-sort-value="after BWV 0093/4" | after BWV 93/4
| 
|- style="background: #E3F6CE;"
| data-sort-value="0648.000" | 648
| data-sort-value="338.004" | 7.
| data-sort-value="1748-12-31" | 1748–1749
| chorale setting "Meine Seele erhebt den Herren" (Schübler Chorales No. 4)
| D min.
| Organ
| data-sort-value="000.25 2: 070" | 252: 70
| data-sort-value="IV/01: 094" | IV/1: 94
| data-sort-value="after BWV 0010/5" | after BWV 10/5
| 
|- style="background: #E3F6CE;"
| data-sort-value="0649.000" | 649
| data-sort-value="338.005" | 7.
| data-sort-value="1748-12-31" | 1748–1749
| chorale setting "Ach bleib bei uns, Herr Jesu Christ" (Schübler Chorales No. 5)
| B♭ maj.
| Organ
| data-sort-value="000.25 2: 071" | 252: 71
| data-sort-value="IV/01: 095" | IV/1: 95
| data-sort-value="after BWV 0006/3" | after BWV 6/3
| 
|- style="background: #E3F6CE;"
| data-sort-value="0650.000" | 650
| data-sort-value="338.006" | 7.
| data-sort-value="1748-12-31" | 1748–1749
| chorale setting "Kommst du nun, Jesu, vom Himmel herunter" (Schübler Chorales No. 6)
| G maj.
| Organ
| data-sort-value="000.25 2: 074" | 252: 74
| data-sort-value="IV/01: 098" | IV/1: 98
| data-sort-value="after BWV 0137/2" | after BWV 137/2
| 
|- style="background: #E3F6CE;"
| data-sort-value="0651.000" | 651
| data-sort-value="339.001" | 7.
| data-sort-value="1747-12-31" | 1747–1748
| chorale setting "Komm, heiliger Geist" (Fantasia; Leipzig Chorales 1/18)
| F maj.
| Organ
| data-sort-value="000.25 2: 079" | 252: 79
| data-sort-value="IV/02: 003" | IV/2: 3
| data-sort-value="after BWV 0651a" | after BWV 651a
| 
|- style="background: #F6E3CE;"
| data-sort-value="0651.A00" | 651a
| data-sort-value="339.002" | 7.
| data-sort-value="1712-12-31" | 1708–1717
| chorale setting "Komm, heiliger Geist, Herre Gott" (Fantasia; e. v.: Weimar)
| 
| Organ
| data-sort-value="000.25 2: 151" | 252: 151
| data-sort-value="IV/02: 117" | IV/2: 117
| after Z 7445a; → BWV 651
| 
|- style="background: #E3F6CE;"
| data-sort-value="0652.000" | 652
| data-sort-value="339.003" | 7.
| data-sort-value="1747-12-31" | 1747–1748
| chorale setting "Komm, heiliger Geist, Herre Gott" (alio modo; Leipzig Chorales 2/18)
| G maj.
| Organ
| data-sort-value="000.25 2: 086" | 252: 86
| data-sort-value="IV/02: 013" | IV/2: 13
| data-sort-value="after BWV 0652a" | after BWV 652a
| 
|- style="background: #F6E3CE;"
| data-sort-value="0652.A00" | 652a
| data-sort-value="339.004" | 7.
| data-sort-value="1712-12-31" | 1708–1717
| chorale setting "Komm, heiliger Geist, Herre Gott" (e. v.: Weimar)
| 
| Organ
| 
| data-sort-value="IV/02: 121" | IV/2: 121
| after Z 7445a; → BWV 652
| 
|- style="background: #E3F6CE;"
| data-sort-value="0653.000" | 653
| data-sort-value="339.005" | 7.
| data-sort-value="1747-12-31" | 1747–1748
| chorale setting "An Wasserflüssen Babylon" (Leipzig Chorales 3/18)
| G maj.
| Organ
| data-sort-value="000.25 2: 092" | 252: 92
| data-sort-value="IV/02: 022" | IV/2: 22
| data-sort-value="after BWV 0653a" | after BWV 653a
| 
|- style="background: #F6E3CE;"
| data-sort-value="0653.A00" | 653a
| data-sort-value="339.006" | 7.
| data-sort-value="1713-01-01" | 1708–1717
| chorale setting "An Wasserflüssen Babylon" (alio modo; 2nd v.: Weimar)
| 
| Organ
| data-sort-value="000.25 2: 157" | 252: 157
| data-sort-value="IV/02: 133" | IV/2: 133
| data-sort-value="after BWV 0653b" | after BWV 653b; → BWV 653
| 
|- style="background: #F6E3CE;"
| data-sort-value="0653.B00" | 653b
| data-sort-value="339.007" | 7.
| data-sort-value="1712-12-31" | 1708–1717
| chorale setting "An Wasserflüssen Babylon" (à 5; 1st v.: Weimar)
| 
| Organ
| data-sort-value="000.40: 049" | 40: 49
| data-sort-value="IV/02: 130" | IV/2: 130
| after Z 7663; → BWV 653a
| 
|- style="background: #E3F6CE;"
| data-sort-value="0654.000" | 654
| data-sort-value="339.008" | 7.
| data-sort-value="1747-12-31" | 1747–1748
| chorale setting "Schmücke dich, o liebe Seele" (Leipzig Chorales 4/18)
| E♭ maj.
| Organ
| data-sort-value="000.25 2: 095" | 252: 95
| data-sort-value="IV/02: 026" | IV/2: 26
| data-sort-value="after BWV 0654a" | after BWV 654a
| 
|- style="background: #F6E3CE;"
| data-sort-value="0654.A00" | 654a
| data-sort-value="339.009" | 7.
| data-sort-value="1712-12-31" | 1708–1717
| chorale setting "Schmücke dich, o liebe Seele" (e. v.: Weimar)
| 
| Organ
| 
| data-sort-value="IV/02: 136" | IV/2: 136
| after Z 6923; → BWV 654
| 
|- style="background: #E3F6CE;"
| data-sort-value="0655.000" | 655
| data-sort-value="339.010" | 7.
| data-sort-value="1747-12-31" | 1747–1748
| chorale setting "Herr Jesu Christ, dich zu uns wend" (Trio; Leipzig Chorales 5/18)
| G maj.
| Organ
| data-sort-value="000.25 2: 098" | 252: 98
| data-sort-value="IV/02: 031" | IV/2: 31
| data-sort-value="after BWV 0655a" | after BWV 655a; ↔ 655 var. 1–4; → 655b–c
| 
|-
| data-sort-value="0655.100" | 655 var. 1
| data-sort-value="339.011" | 7.
| data-sort-value="1752-07-01" | 1708–1798
| chorale setting "Herr Jesu Christ, dich zu uns wend" (variant 1)
| 
| Organ
| 
| 
| data-sort-value="after Z 0624; ↔ BWV 0655(a), var. 2–4" | after Z 624; ↔ BWV 655(a), var. 2–4
| 
|-
| data-sort-value="0655.200" | 655 var. 2
| data-sort-value="339.012" | 7.
| data-sort-value="1752-07-01" | 1708–1798
| chorale setting "Herr Jesu Christ, dich zu uns wend" (variant 2)
| F maj.
| Organ
| 
| 
| data-sort-value="after Z 0624; ↔ BWV 0655(a), var. 1, 3–4" | after Z 624; ↔ BWV 655(a), var. 1, 3–4
| 
|-
| data-sort-value="0655.300" | 655 var. 3
| data-sort-value="339.013" | 7.
| data-sort-value="1752-07-01" | 1708–1798
| chorale setting "Herr Jesu Christ, dich zu uns wend" (variant 3)
| F maj.
| Organ
| 
| 
| data-sort-value="after Z 0624; ↔ BWV 0655(a), var. 1–2, 4" | after Z 624; ↔ BWV 655(a), var. 1–2, 4
| 
|-
| data-sort-value="0655.400" | 655 var. 4
| data-sort-value="339.014" | 7.
| data-sort-value="1752-07-01" | 1708–1798
| chorale setting "Herr Jesu Christ, dich zu uns wend" (variant 4)
| F maj.
| Organ
| 
| 
| data-sort-value="after Z 0624; ↔ BWV 0655(a), var. 1–3" | after Z 624; ↔ BWV 655(a), var. 1–3
| 
|- style="background: #F6E3CE;"
| data-sort-value="0655.A00" | 655a
| data-sort-value="339.015" | 7.
| data-sort-value="1713-01-01" | 1708–1717
| chorale setting "Herr Jesu Christ, dich zu uns wend" (Trio; e. v.: Weimar)
| 
| Organ
| data-sort-value="000.25 2: 162" | 252: 162
| data-sort-value="IV/02: 140" | IV/2: 140
| data-sort-value="after Z 0624; ↔ BWV 0655 var. 1–4" | after Z 624; ↔ BWV 655 var. 1–4; → 655
| 
|- style="background: #E3F6CE;"
| data-sort-value="0656.000" | 656
| data-sort-value="339.021" | 7.
| data-sort-value="1747-12-31" | 1747–1748
| chorale setting "O Lamm Gottes, unschuldig" (Leipzig Chorales 6/18)
| A maj.
| Organ
| data-sort-value="000.25 2: 102" | 252: 102
| data-sort-value="IV/02: 038" | IV/2: 38
| data-sort-value="after BWV 0656a" | after BWV 656a
| 
|- style="background: #F6E3CE;"
| data-sort-value="0656.A00" | 656a
| data-sort-value="339.022" | 7.
| data-sort-value="1712-12-31" | 1708–1717
| chorale setting "O Lamm Gottes, unschuldig" (e. v.: Weimar)
| 
| Organ
| data-sort-value="000.25 2: 166" | 252: 166
| data-sort-value="IV/02: 146" | IV/2: 146
| after Z 4361b; → BWV 656
| 
|- style="background: #E3F6CE;"
| data-sort-value="0657.000" | 657
| data-sort-value="339.023" | 7.
| data-sort-value="1712-12-31" | 1708–1717
| Chorale prelude Nun danket alle Gott (Leipzig Chorales 7/18)
| G maj.
| Organ
| data-sort-value="000.25 2: 108" | 252: 108
| data-sort-value="IV/02: 046" | IV/2: 46
| after Z 5142
| 
|- style="background: #E3F6CE;"
| data-sort-value="0658.000" | 658
| data-sort-value="339.024" | 7.
| data-sort-value="1747-12-31" | 1747–1748
| chorale setting "Von Gott will ich nicht lassen" (Leipzig Chorales 8/18)
| F min.
| Organ
| data-sort-value="000.25 2: 112" | 252: 112
| data-sort-value="IV/02: 051" | IV/2: 51
| data-sort-value="after BWV 0658a" | after BWV 658a
| 
|- style="background: #F6E3CE;"
| data-sort-value="0658.A00" | 658a
| data-sort-value="339.025" | 7.
| data-sort-value="1712-12-31" | 1708–1717
| chorale setting "Von Gott will ich nicht lassen" (Fantasia; e. v.: Weimar)
| 
| Organ
| data-sort-value="000.25 2: 170" | 252: 170
| data-sort-value="IV/02: 154" | IV/2: 154
| after Z 5264b → BWV 658
| 
|- style="background: #E3F6CE;"
| data-sort-value="0659.000" | 659
| data-sort-value="339.026" | 7.
| data-sort-value="1747-12-31" | 1747–1748
| chorale setting "Nun komm, der Heiden Heiland" (Leipzig Chorales 9/18)
| G min.
| Organ
| data-sort-value="000.25 2: 114" | 252: 114
| data-sort-value="IV/02: 055" | IV/2: 55
| data-sort-value="after BWV 0659a" | after BWV 659a
| 
|- style="background: #F6E3CE;"
| data-sort-value="0659.A00" | 659a
| data-sort-value="339.027" | 7.
| data-sort-value="1712-12-31" | 1708–1717
| chorale setting "Nun komm, der Heiden Heiland" (Fantasia; e. v.: Weimar)
| 
| Organ
| data-sort-value="000.25 2: 172" | 252: 172
| data-sort-value="IV/02: 157" | IV/2: 157
| after Z 1174; → BWV 659
| 
|- style="background: #E3F6CE;"
| data-sort-value="0660.000" | 660
| data-sort-value="340.001" | 7.
| data-sort-value="1747-12-31" | 1747–1748
| chorale setting "Nun komm, der Heiden Heiland" (Trio; Leipzig Chorales 10/18)
| G min.
| Organ
| data-sort-value="000.25 2: 116" | 252: 116
| data-sort-value="IV/02: 059" | IV/2: 59
| data-sort-value="after BWV 0660a" | after BWV 660a
| 
|- style="background: #E3F6CE;"
| data-sort-value="0660.A00" | 660a
| data-sort-value="340.002" | 7.
| data-sort-value="1712-12-31" | 1708–1717
|chorale setting "Nun komm, der Heiden Heiland" (Trio; e. v.: Weimar)
| 
| Organ
| data-sort-value="000.25 2: 174" | 252: 174
| data-sort-value="IV/02: 160" | IV/2: 160
| after Z 1174; → BWV 660, 660b
| 
|- style="background: #F6E3CE;"
| data-sort-value="0660.B00" | 660b
| data-sort-value="340.003" | 7.
| data-sort-value="1713-12-31" | 1708–1719
| chorale setting "Nun komm, der Heiden Heiland" (arrangement)
| 
| Organ
| data-sort-value="000.25 2: 176" | 252: 176
| 
| by Krebs, J. T. (arr.)?; after BWV 660a
| 
|- style="background: #E3F6CE;"
| data-sort-value="0661.000" | 661
| data-sort-value="340.004" | 7.
| data-sort-value="1747-12-31" | 1747–1748
| chorale setting "Nun komm, der Heiden Heiland" (Leipzig Chorales 11/18)
| G min.
| Organ
| data-sort-value="000.25 2: 118" | 252: 118
| data-sort-value="IV/02: 062" | IV/2: 62
| data-sort-value="after BWV 0661a" | after BWV 661a
| 
|- style="background: #F6E3CE;"
| data-sort-value="0661.A00" | 661a
| data-sort-value="340.005" | 7.
| data-sort-value="1712-12-31" | 1708–1717
| chorale setting "Nun komm, der Heiden Heiland" (e. v.: Weimar)
| 
| Organ
| data-sort-value="000.25 2: 178" | 252: 178
| data-sort-value="IV/02: 164" | IV/2: 164
| after Z 1174; → BWV 661
| 
|- style="background: #E3F6CE;"
| data-sort-value="0662.000" | 662
| data-sort-value="340.006" | 7.
| data-sort-value="1747-12-31" | 1747–1748
| chorale setting "Allein Gott in der Höh sei Ehr" (Leipzig Chorales 12/18)
| A maj.
| Organ
| data-sort-value="000.25 2: 122" | 252: 122
| data-sort-value="IV/02: 067" | IV/2: 67
| data-sort-value="after BWV 0662a" | after BWV 662a
| 
|- style="background: #F6E3CE;"
| data-sort-value="0662.A00" | 662a
| data-sort-value="340.007" | 7.
| data-sort-value="1712-12-31" | 1708–1717
| chorale setting "Allein Gott in der Höh sei Ehr" (e. v.: Weimar)
| 
| Organ
| 
| data-sort-value="IV/02: 168" | IV/2: 168
| after Z 4457; → BWV 662
| 
|- style="background: #E3F6CE;"
| data-sort-value="0663.000" | 663
| data-sort-value="340.008" | 7.
| data-sort-value="1747-12-31" | 1747–1748
| chorale setting "Allein Gott in der Höh sei Ehr" (Leipzig Chorales 13/18)
| G maj.
| Organ
| data-sort-value="000.25 2: 125" | 252: 125
| data-sort-value="IV/02: 072" | IV/2: 72
| data-sort-value="after BWV 0663a" | after BWV 663a
| 
|- style="background: #F6E3CE;"
| data-sort-value="0663.A00" | 663a
| data-sort-value="340.009" | 7.
| data-sort-value="1712-12-31" | 1708–1717
| chorale setting "Allein Gott in der Höh sei Ehr" (e. v.: Weimar)
| 
| Organ
| data-sort-value="000.25 2: 180" | 252: 180
| data-sort-value="IV/02: 172" | IV/2: 172
| after Z 4457; → BWV 663
| 
|- style="background: #E3F6CE;"
| data-sort-value="0664.000" | 664
| data-sort-value="340.010" | 7.
| data-sort-value="1747-12-31" | 1747–1748
| chorale setting "Allein Gott in der Höh sei Ehr" (Trio; Leipzig Chorales 14/18)
| A maj.
| Organ
| data-sort-value="000.25 2: 130" | 252: 130
| data-sort-value="IV/02: 079" | IV/2: 79
| data-sort-value="after BWV 0664a–b" | after BWV 664a–b
| 
|- style="background: #F6E3CE;"
| data-sort-value="0664.A00" | 664a
| data-sort-value="340.011" | 7.
| data-sort-value="1713-01-01" | 1708–1717
| chorale setting "Allein Gott in der Höh sei Ehr" (Trio; e. v.: Weimar; fair copy)
| 
| Organ
| data-sort-value="000.25 2: 183" | 252: 183
| data-sort-value="IV/02" | IV/2
| data-sort-value="after BWV 0664b" | after BWV 664b; → BWV 664
| 
|- style="background: #F6E3CE;"
| data-sort-value="0664.B00" | 664b
| data-sort-value="340.012" | 7.
| data-sort-value="1712-12-31" | 1708–1717
| chorale setting "Allein Gott in der Höh sei Ehr" (Trio; e. v.: Weimar; sketch)
| 
| Organ
| 
| data-sort-value="IV/02: 179" | IV/2: 179
| after Z 4457; → BWV 664(a)
| 
|- style="background: #E3F6CE;"
| data-sort-value="0665.000" | 665
| data-sort-value="340.013" | 7.
| data-sort-value="1747-12-31" | 1747–1748
| chorale setting "Jesus Christus, unser Heiland" (Leipzig Chorales 15/18)
| E min.
| Organ
| data-sort-value="000.25 2: 136" | 252: 136
| data-sort-value="IV/02: 087" | IV/2: 87
| data-sort-value="after BWV 0665a" | after BWV 665a
| 
|- style="background: #F6E3CE;"
| data-sort-value="0665.A00" | 665a
| data-sort-value="340.014" | 7.
| data-sort-value="1712-12-31" | 1708–1717
| chorale setting "Jesus Christus, unser Heiland" (e. v.: Weimar)
| 
| Organ
| data-sort-value="000.25 2: 188" | 252: 188
| data-sort-value="IV/02: 187" | IV/2: 187
| after Z 1576; → BWV 665
| 
|- style="background: #E3F6CE;"
| data-sort-value="0666.000" | 666
| data-sort-value="340.015" | 7.
| data-sort-value="1727-07-01" | 1708–1748
| chorale setting "Jesus Christus, unser Heiland" (alio modo; Leipzig Chorales 16/18)
| E min.
| Organ
| data-sort-value="000.25 2: 140" | 252: 140
| data-sort-value="IV/02: 091" | IV/2: 91
| data-sort-value="after BWV 0666a" | after BWV 666a
| 
|- style="background: #F6E3CE;"
| data-sort-value="0666.A00" | 666a
| data-sort-value="340.016" | 7.
| data-sort-value="1712-12-31" | 1708–1717
| chorale setting "Jesus Christus, unser Heiland" (alio modo; e. v.: Weimar)
| 
| Organ
| 
| data-sort-value="IV/02: 191" | IV/2: 191
| after Z 1576; → BWV 666
| 
|- style="background: #E3F6CE;"
| data-sort-value="0667.000" | 667
| data-sort-value="340.017" | 7.
| data-sort-value="1747-12-31" | 1747–1748
| chorale setting "Komm, Gott Schöpfer, heiliger Geist" (Leipzig Chorales 17/18)
| C maj.
| Organ
| data-sort-value="000.25 2: 142" | 252: 142
| data-sort-value="IV/02: 094" | IV/2: 94
| data-sort-value="after BWV 0667a" | after BWV 667a
| 
|- style="background: #F6E3CE;"
| data-sort-value="0667.A00" | 667a
| data-sort-value="340.018" | 7.
| data-sort-value="1713-01-01" | 1708–1717
| chorale setting "Komm, Gott Schöpfer, heiliger Geist" (e. v.: Weimar)
| 
| Organ
| 
| data-sort-value="IV/02" | IV/2
| data-sort-value="after BWV 0667b" | after BWV 667b; → BWV 667
| 
|- style="background: #F6E3CE;"
| data-sort-value="0667.B00" | 667b
| data-sort-value="340.019" | 7.
| data-sort-value="1712-12-31" | 1708–1717
| chorale setting "Komm, Gott Schöpfer, heiliger Geist" (e. v.: Weimar; sketch)
| 
| Organ
| 
| data-sort-value="IV/02: 194" | IV/2: 194
| data-sort-value="after Z 0295; → BWV 0667a" | after Z 295; → BWV 667(a)
| 
|-
| data-sort-value="0668.000" | 668
| data-sort-value="340.020" | 7.
| data-sort-value="1747-12-31" | 1747–1748
| chorale setting "Vor deinen Thron tret ich hiermit" (fragment; Leipzig Chorales 18/18)
| G maj.
| Organ
| data-sort-value="000.25 2: 145" | 252: 145
| data-sort-value="IV/02: 113" | IV/2: 113
| data-sort-value="after BWV 0668a" | after BWV 668a
| 
|- style="background: #E3F6CE;"
| data-sort-value="0668.A00" | 668a
| data-sort-value="340.021" | 7.
| data-sort-value="1727-07-01" | 1708–1748
| chorale setting "Wenn wir in höchsten Nöten" (e. v.)
| 
| Organ
| 
| data-sort-value="IV/02: 212" | IV/2: 212
| data-sort-value="after Z 0394; → BWV 0668" | after Z 394; → BWV 668
| 
|- style="background: #E3F6CE;"
| data-sort-value="0669.000" | 669
| data-sort-value="341.002" | 7.
| data-sort-value="1739-07-01" | 1739
| chorale setting "Kyrie, Gott Vater in Ewigkeit" from Clavier-Übung III| 
| Organ
| data-sort-value="000.03: 184" | 3: 184
| data-sort-value="IV/04: 016" | IV/4: 16
| after Z 8600
| 
|- style="background: #E3F6CE;"
| data-sort-value="0670.000" | 670
| data-sort-value="341.003" | 7.
| data-sort-value="1739-07-01" | 1739
| chorale setting "Christe, aller Welt Trost" from Clavier-Übung III| 
| Organ
| data-sort-value="000.03: 186" | 3: 186
| data-sort-value="IV/04: 018" | IV/4: 18
| after Z 8600
| 
|- style="background: #E3F6CE;"
| data-sort-value="0671.000" | 671
| data-sort-value="341.004" | 7.
| data-sort-value="1739-07-01" | 1739
| chorale setting "Kyrie, Gott heiliger Geist" from Clavier-Übung III| 
| Organ
| data-sort-value="000.03: 190" | 3: 190
| data-sort-value="IV/04: 020" | IV/4: 20
| after Z 8600
| 
|- style="background: #E3F6CE;"
| data-sort-value="0672.000" | 672
| data-sort-value="341.005" | 7.
| data-sort-value="1739-07-01" | 1739
| chorale setting "Kyrie, Gott Vater in Ewigkeit" from Clavier-Übung III| 
| Org/man.
| data-sort-value="000.03: 194" | 3: 194
| data-sort-value="IV/04: 027" | IV/4: 27
| after Z 8600
| 
|- style="background: #E3F6CE;"
| data-sort-value="0673.000" | 673
| data-sort-value="341.006" | 7.
| data-sort-value="1739-07-01" | 1739
| chorale setting "Christe, aller Welt Trost" from Clavier-Übung III| 
| Org/man.
| data-sort-value="000.03: 195" | 3: 194
| data-sort-value="IV/04: 028" | IV/4: 28
| after Z 8600
| 
|- style="background: #E3F6CE;"
| data-sort-value="0674.000" | 674
| data-sort-value="341.007" | 7.
| data-sort-value="1739-07-01" | 1739
| chorale setting "Kyrie, Gott heiliger Geist" from Clavier-Übung III| 
| Org/man.
| data-sort-value="000.03: 196" | 3: 196
| data-sort-value="IV/04: 029" | IV/4: 29
| after Z 8600
| 
|- style="background: #E3F6CE;"
| data-sort-value="0675.000" | 675
| data-sort-value="341.008" | 7.
| data-sort-value="1739-07-01" | 1739
| chorale setting "Allein Gott in der Höh sei Ehr" from Clavier-Übung III| 
| Organ
| data-sort-value="000.03: 197" | 3: 197
| data-sort-value="IV/04: 030" | IV/4: 30
| after Z 4457
| 
|- style="background: #E3F6CE;"
| data-sort-value="0676.000" | 676
| data-sort-value="341.009" | 7.
| data-sort-value="1739-07-01" | 1739
| chorale setting "Allein Gott in der Höh sei Ehr" from Clavier-Übung III| 
| Organ
| data-sort-value="000.03: 199" | 3: 199
| data-sort-value="IV/04: 033" | IV/4: 33
| after Z 4457; → BWV 676a
| 
|- style="background: #E3F6CE;"
| data-sort-value="0677.000" | 677
| data-sort-value="341.010" | 7.
| data-sort-value="1739-07-01" | 1739
| chorale setting "Allein Gott in der Höh sei Ehr" (Fughetta) from Clavier-Übung III| 
| Org/man.
| data-sort-value="000.03: 205" | 3: 205
| data-sort-value="IV/04: 041" | IV/4: 41
| after Z 4457
| 
|- style="background: #E3F6CE;"
| data-sort-value="0678.000" | 678
| data-sort-value="341.011" | 7.
| data-sort-value="1739-07-01" | 1739
| chorale setting "Dies sind die heiligen zehen Gebot" from Clavier-Übung III| 
| Organ
| data-sort-value="000.03: 206" | 3: 206
| data-sort-value="IV/04: 042" | IV/4: 42
| after Z 1951
| 
|- style="background: #E3F6CE;"
| data-sort-value="0679.000" | 679
| data-sort-value="341.012" | 7.
| data-sort-value="1739-07-01" | 1739
| chorale setting "Dies sind die heiligen zehen Gebot" (Fughetta) from Clavier-Übung III| 
| Org/man.
| data-sort-value="000.03: 210" | 3: 210
| data-sort-value="IV/04: 049" | IV/4: 49
| after Z 1951
| 
|- style="background: #E3F6CE;"
| data-sort-value="0680.000" | 680
| data-sort-value="341.013" | 7.
| data-sort-value="1739-07-01" | 1739
| chorale setting "Wir gläuben all an einen Gott" from Clavier-Übung III| 
| Organ
| data-sort-value="000.03: 212" | 3: 212
| data-sort-value="IV/04: 052" | IV/4: 52
| after Z 7971
| 
|- style="background: #E3F6CE;"
| data-sort-value="0681.000" | 681
| data-sort-value="342.001" | 7.
| data-sort-value="1739-07-01" | 1739
| chorale setting "Wir gläuben all an einen Gott" (Fughetta) from Clavier-Übung III| 
| Org/man.
| data-sort-value="000.03: 216" | 3: 216
| data-sort-value="IV/04: 057" | IV/4: 57
| after Z 7971
| 
|- style="background: #E3F6CE;"
| data-sort-value="0682.000" | 682
| data-sort-value="342.002" | 7.
| data-sort-value="1739-07-01" | 1739
| chorale setting "Vater unser im Himmelreich" from Clavier-Übung III| 
| Organ
| data-sort-value="000.03: 217" | 3: 217
| data-sort-value="IV/04: 058" | IV/4: 58
| after Z 2561
| 
|- style="background: #E3F6CE;"
| data-sort-value="0683.000" | 683
| data-sort-value="342.003" | 7.
| data-sort-value="1739-07-01" | 1739
| chorale setting "Vater unser im Himmelreich" from Clavier-Übung III| 
| Org/man.
| data-sort-value="000.03: 223" | 3: 223
| data-sort-value="IV/04: 066" | IV/4: 66
| after Z 2561; → BWV 683a
| 
|- style="background: #E3F6CE;"
| data-sort-value="0684.000" | 684
| data-sort-value="342.005" | 7.
| data-sort-value="1739-07-01" | 1739
| chorale setting "Christ unser Herr zum Jordan kam" from Clavier-Übung III| 
| Organ
| data-sort-value="000.03: 224" | 3: 224
| data-sort-value="IV/04: 068" | IV/4: 68
| after Z 7246
| 
|- style="background: #E3F6CE;"
| data-sort-value="0685.000" | 685
| data-sort-value="342.006" | 7.
| data-sort-value="1739-07-01" | 1739
| chorale setting "Christ unser Herr zum Jordan kam" from Clavier-Übung III| 
| Org/man.
| data-sort-value="000.03: 228" | 3: 228
| data-sort-value="IV/04: 073" | IV/4: 73
| after Z 7246
| 
|- style="background: #E3F6CE;"
| data-sort-value="0686.000" | 686
| data-sort-value="342.007" | 7.
| data-sort-value="1739-07-01" | 1739
| chorale setting "Aus tiefer Not schrei ich zu dir" from Clavier-Übung III| 
| Organ
| data-sort-value="000.03: 229" | 3: 229
| data-sort-value="IV/04: 074" | IV/4: 74
| after Z 4437
| 
|- style="background: #E3F6CE;"
| data-sort-value="0687.000" | 687
| data-sort-value="342.008" | 7.
| data-sort-value="1739-07-01" | 1739
| chorale setting "Aus tiefer Not schrei ich zu dir" from Clavier-Übung III| 
| Org/man.
| data-sort-value="000.03: 232" | 3: 232
| data-sort-value="IV/04: 078" | IV/4: 78
| after Z 4437
| 
|- style="background: #E3F6CE;"
| data-sort-value="0688.000" | 688
| data-sort-value="342.009" | 7.
| data-sort-value="1739-07-01" | 1739
| chorale setting "Jesus Christus, unser Heiland, der von uns den Zorn Gottes wandt" from Clavier-Übung III| 
| Organ
| data-sort-value="000.03: 234" | 3: 234
| data-sort-value="IV/04: 081" | IV/4: 81
| after Z 1576
| 
|- style="background: #E3F6CE;"
| data-sort-value="0689.000" | 689
| data-sort-value="342.010" | 7.
| data-sort-value="1739-07-01" | 1739
| chorale setting "Jesus Christus, unser Heiland, der von uns den Zorn Gottes wandt" (Fugue) from Clavier-Übung III| 
| Org/man.
| data-sort-value="000.03: 239" | 3: 239
| data-sort-value="IV/04: 089" | IV/4: 89
| after Z 1576
| 
|- id="BWV 690" style="background: #F6E3CE;"
| data-sort-value="0690.000" | 690
| data-sort-value="343.002" | 7.
| data-sort-value="1708-12-31" | 1700–1717
| chorale setting "Wer nur den lieben Gott lässt walten" (Kirnberger collection No. 1)
| 
| Organ
| data-sort-value="000.40: 003" | 40: 3
| data-sort-value="IV/03: 098" | IV/3: 98
| after Z 2778
| 
|- style="background: #E3F6CE;"
| data-sort-value="0691.000" | 691
| data-sort-value="343.003" | 7.
| data-sort-value="1720-07-01" | 1720 or earlier
| data-sort-value="Notebook A. M. Bach (1725) No. 11" | Notebook A. M. Bach (1725) No. 11 chorale setting "Wer nur den lieben Gott lässt walten" (WFB No. 3; Kirnb. coll. No. 2)
| 
| Organ
| data-sort-value="000.40: 004" | 40: 4432: 30451: 214
| data-sort-value="V/05: 006 V/04: 090" | V/5: 6V/4: 90IV/3: 98
| after Z 2778; → BWV 691a
| 
|- style="background: #F6E3CE;"
| data-sort-value="0694.000" | 694
| data-sort-value="343.012" | 7.
| data-sort-value="1708-12-31" | 1700–1717
| chorale setting "Wo soll ich fliehen hin" (Kirnb. coll. No. 5)
| 
| Organ
| data-sort-value="000.40: 006" | 40: 6
| data-sort-value="IV/03: 103" | IV/3: 103
| after Z 2164
| 
|- style="background: #F6E3CE;"
| data-sort-value="0695.000" | 695
| data-sort-value="343.013" | 7.
| data-sort-value="1708-12-31" | 1700–1717
| chorale setting "Christ lag in Todesbanden" (Fantasia; Kirnb. coll. No. 6)
| 
| Organ
| data-sort-value="000.40: 010" | 40: 10
| data-sort-value="IV/03: 020" | IV/3: 20
| after Z 7012a; → BWV 695a
| 
|- 
| data-sort-value="0695.A00" | 695a
| data-sort-value="343.014" | 7.
| data-sort-value="1744-12-31" | 1700–1789
| chorale setting "Christ lag in Todesbanden" (variant)
| 
| Organ
| data-sort-value="000.40: 153" | 40: 153
| 
| data-sort-value="after BWV 0695" | after BWV 695
| 
|-
| data-sort-value="0696.000" rowspan="2" | 696
| data-sort-value="343.015" rowspan="2" | 7.
| data-sort-value="1708-12-31" rowspan="2" | 1700–1717
| chorale setting "Christum wir sollen loben schon" (Fughetta; Kirnb. coll. No. 7)
| rowspan="2" | 
| rowspan="2" | Organ
| data-sort-value="000.40: 013" rowspan="2" | 40: 13
| data-sort-value="IV/03: 023" rowspan="2" | IV/3: 23
| data-sort-value="after Z 0297c" rowspan="2" | after Z 297c
| rowspan="2" | 
|-
| chorale setting "Was fürchtest du Feind, Herodes, sehr" (Fughetta; Kirnb. coll. No. 7)
|-
| data-sort-value="0697.000" | 697
| data-sort-value="343.016" | 7.
| data-sort-value="1708-12-31" | 1700–1717
| chorale setting "Gelobet seist du, Jesu Christ" (Fughetta; Kirnb. coll. No. 8)
| 
| Organ
| data-sort-value="000.40: 014" | 40: 14
| data-sort-value="IV/03: 032" | IV/3: 32
| after Z 1947
| 
|-
| data-sort-value="0698.000" | 698
| data-sort-value="343.017" | 7.
| data-sort-value="1708-12-31" | 1700–1717
| chorale setting "Herr Christ, der ein'ge Gottes Sohn" (Fughetta; Kirnb. coll. No. 9)
| 
| Organ
| data-sort-value="000.40: 015" | 40: 15
| data-sort-value="IV/03: 035" | IV/3: 35
|  after Z 4297a
| 
|-
| data-sort-value="0699.000" | 699
| data-sort-value="343.018" | 7.
| data-sort-value="1708-12-31" | 1700–1717
| chorale setting "Nun komm, der Heiden Heiland" (Fughetta; Kirnb. coll. No. 10)
| 
| Organ
| data-sort-value="000.40: 016" | 40: 16
| data-sort-value="IV/03: 073" | IV/3: 73
| after Z 1174
| 
|-
| data-sort-value="0700.000" | 700
| data-sort-value="343.019" | 7.
| data-sort-value="1699-07-01" | 1699
| chorale setting "Vom Himmel hoch da komm ich her" (Kirnb. coll. No. 11)
| 
| Organ
| data-sort-value="000.40: 017" | 40: 17
| data-sort-value="IV/03: 092" | IV/3: 92
| data-sort-value="after Z 0346" | after Z 346
| 
|-
| data-sort-value="0701.000" | 701
| data-sort-value="344.001" | 7.
| data-sort-value="1708-12-31" | 1700–1717
| chorale setting "Vom Himmel hoch da komm ich her" (Fughetta; Kirnb. coll. No. 12)
| 
| Organ
| data-sort-value="000.40: 019" | 40: 19
| data-sort-value="IV/03: 096" | IV/3: 96
| data-sort-value="after Z 0346" | after Z 346
| 
|-
| data-sort-value="0702.000" | 702
| data-sort-value="344.002" | 7.
| data-sort-value="1708-12-31" | 1700–1717
| chorale setting "Das Jesulein soll doch mein Trost" (Fughetta; Kirnb. coll. No. 13)
| 
| Organ
| data-sort-value="000.40: 020" | 40: 20
| data-sort-value="IV/03: 045" | IV/3: 45
| after Z 7597
| 
|-
| data-sort-value="0703.000" | 703
| data-sort-value="344.003" | 7.
| data-sort-value="1708-12-31" | 1700–1717
| chorale setting "Gottes Sohn ist kommen" (Fughetta; Kirnb. coll. No. 14)
| 
| Organ
| data-sort-value="000.40: 021" | 40: 21
| data-sort-value="IV/03: 034" | IV/3: 34
| after Z 3294
| 
|-
| data-sort-value="0704.000" | 704
| data-sort-value="344.004" | 7.
| data-sort-value="1708-12-31" | 1700–1717
| chorale setting "Lob sei dem allmächtigen Gott" (Fughetta; Kirnb. coll. No. 15)
| 
| Organ
| data-sort-value="000.40: 022" | 40: 22
| data-sort-value="IV/03: 062" | IV/3: 62
| data-sort-value="after Z 0339" | after Z 339
| 
|-
| data-sort-value="0705.000" | 705
| data-sort-value="344.005" | 7.
| data-sort-value="1708-12-31" | 1700–1717
| chorale setting "Durch Adams Fall ist ganz verderbt" (Kirnb. coll. No. 16)
| 
| Organ
| data-sort-value="000.40: 023" | 40: 23
| data-sort-value="IV/10: 047" | IV/10: 47
| after Z 7549
| 
|- style="background: #F6E3CE;"
| data-sort-value="0706.000" | 706/1706/2
| data-sort-value="344.006" | 7.
| data-sort-value="1708-12-31" | 1700–1717
| chorale setting "Liebster Jesu, wir sind hier" (/2 = alio modo; Kirnb. coll. No. 17)
| 
| Organ
| data-sort-value="000.40: 025" | 40: 25
| data-sort-value="IV/03: 059" | IV/3: 59
| after Z 3498b
| 
|-
| data-sort-value="0707.000" | 707
| data-sort-value="344.007" | 7.
| data-sort-value="1708-12-31" | 1700–1717
| chorale setting "Ich hab mein Sach Gott heimgestellt" (Kirnb. coll. No. 18)
| 
| Organ
| data-sort-value="000.40: 026" | 40: 26
| data-sort-value="IV/10: 087" | IV/10: 87
| after Z 1679
| 
|-
| data-sort-value="0708.000" | 708
| data-sort-value="344.008" | 7.
| data-sort-value="1744-12-31" | 1700–1789
| chorale setting "Ich hab mein Sach Gott heimgestellt" (alio modo; Kirnb. coll. No. 19)
| 
| Organ
| data-sort-value="000.40: 030" | 40: 30
| data-sort-value="IV/10: 086" | IV/10: 86
| after Z 1679
| 
|-
| data-sort-value="0708.A00" | 708a
| data-sort-value="344.009" | 7.
| data-sort-value="1744-12-31" | 1700–1789
| chorale setting "Ich hab mein Sach Gott heimgestellt"
| 
| Organ
| data-sort-value="000.40: 152" | 40: 152
| data-sort-value="IV/10: 086" | IV/10: 86
| after Z 1679
| 
|-
| data-sort-value="0709.000" | 709
| data-sort-value="344.010" | 7.
| data-sort-value="1708-12-31" | 1700–1717
| chorale setting "Herr Jesu Christ, dich zu uns wend" (Kirnb. coll. No. 20)
| 
| Organ
| data-sort-value="000.40: 031" | 40: 30
| data-sort-value="IV/03: 043" | IV/3: 43
| data-sort-value="after Z 0624" | after Z 624
| 
|- style="background: #F6E3CE;"
| data-sort-value="0710.000" | 710
| data-sort-value="344.011" | 7.
| data-sort-value="1708-12-31" | 1700–1717
| chorale setting "Wir Christenleut habn jetzund Freud" (Kirnb. coll. No. 21)
| 
| Organ
| data-sort-value="000.40: 032" | 40: 32
| data-sort-value="IV/03: 100" | IV/3: 100
| after Z 2072
| 
|- style="background: #F6E3CE;"
| data-sort-value="0711.000" | 711
| data-sort-value="344.012" | 7.
| data-sort-value="1708-12-31" | 1700–1717
| chorale setting "Allein Gott in der Höh sei Ehr" (bicinium; Kirnb. coll. No. 22)
| 
| Organ
| data-sort-value="000.40: 034" | 40: 34
| data-sort-value="IV/03: 011" | IV/3: 11
| after Z 4457
| 
|- style="background: #F6E3CE;"
| data-sort-value="0712.000" | 712
| data-sort-value="344.013" | 7.
| data-sort-value="1708-07-01" | 1708
| chorale setting "In dich hab ich gehoffet, Herr" (Kirnb. coll. No. 23)
| 
| Organ
| data-sort-value="000.40: 036" | 40: 36
| data-sort-value="IV/03: 048" | IV/3: 48
| after Z 2461
| 
|- style="background: #F6E3CE;"
| data-sort-value="0713.000" | 713
| data-sort-value="344.014" | 7.
| data-sort-value="1708-12-31" | 1700–1717
| chorale setting "Jesu, meine Freude" (Kirnb. coll. No. 24)
| 
| Org/man.
| data-sort-value="000.40: 038" | 40: 38
| data-sort-value="IV/03: 054" | IV/3: 54
| after Z 8032; → BWV 713a
| 
|-
| data-sort-value="0713.A00" | 713a
| data-sort-value="345.001" | 7.
| data-sort-value="1744-12-31" | 1700–1789
| chorale setting "Jesu, meine Freude" (Fantasia; variant)
| 
| Organ
| data-sort-value="000.40: 155" | 40: 155
| data-sort-value="IV/10: 093" | IV/10: 93
| data-sort-value="after BWV 0713" | after BWV 713
| 
|- style="background: #F6E3CE;"
| data-sort-value="0714.000" | 714
| data-sort-value="345.002" | 7.
| data-sort-value="1712-12-31" | 1708–1717
| chorale setting "Ach Gott und Herr" (Neumeister Chorales No. 13)
| 
| Organ
| data-sort-value="000.40: 043" | 40: 43
| data-sort-value="IV/09: 026" | IV/9: 26IV/3: 3
| after Z 2050, 2052
| 
|- style="background: #F6E3CE;"
| data-sort-value="0715.000" | 715
| data-sort-value="345.003" | 7.
| data-sort-value="1710-07-01" | 1703–1717
| chorale setting "Allein Gott in der Höh sei Ehr"
| 
| Organ
| data-sort-value="000.40: 044" | 40: 44
| data-sort-value="IV/03: 014" | IV/3: 14
| after Z 4457
| 
|-
| data-sort-value="0716.000" | 716
| data-sort-value="345.004" | 7.
| data-sort-value="1708-12-31" | 1700–1717
| chorale setting "Allein Gott in der Höh sei Ehr" (Fantasia)
| 
| Organ
| data-sort-value="000.40: 045" | 40: 45
| data-sort-value="IV/10: 014" | IV/10: 14
| after Z 4457
| 
|- style="background: #F6E3CE;"
| data-sort-value="0717.000" | 717
| data-sort-value="345.005" | 7.
| data-sort-value="1712-12-31" | 1708–1717
| chorale setting "Allein Gott in der Höh sei Ehr"
| 
| Organ
| data-sort-value="000.40: 046" | 40: 46
| data-sort-value="IV/03: 008" | IV/3: 8
| after Z 4457
| 
|- style="background: #F6E3CE;"
| data-sort-value="0718.000" | 718
| data-sort-value="345.006" | 7.
| data-sort-value="1708-12-31" | 1700–1717
| chorale setting "Christ lag in Todesbanden"
| 
| Organ
| data-sort-value="000.40: 052" | 40: 52
| data-sort-value="IV/03: 016" | IV/3: 16
| after Z 7012a
| 
|- id="NBA IV-9"
| data-sort-value="0719.000" | 719
| data-sort-value="345.007" | 7.
| data-sort-value="1704-07-01" | 1704
| chorale setting "Der Tag, der ist so freudenreich" (Neumeister Chorales No. 1)
| 
| Organ
| data-sort-value="000.40: 055" | 40: 55
| data-sort-value="IV/09: 002" | IV/9: 2, 72
| after Z 7870
| 
|- style="background: #F6E3CE;"
| data-sort-value="0720.000" | 720
| data-sort-value="345.008" | 7.
| data-sort-value="1709-07-01" | 1709?
| chorale setting "Ein feste Burg ist unser Gott"
| 
| Organ
| data-sort-value="000.40: 057" | 40: 57
| data-sort-value="IV/03: 024" | IV/3: 24
| after Z 7377; by Bach, J. Michael?
| 
|- style="background: #F6E3CE;"
| data-sort-value="0721.000" | 721
| data-sort-value="345.009" | 7.
| data-sort-value="1704-07-01" | 1704
| chorale setting "Erbarm dich mein, o Herre Gott"
| 
| Organ
| data-sort-value="000.40: 060" | 40: 60
| data-sort-value="IV/03: 028" | IV/3: 28
| after Z 5851
| 
|- style="background: #F6E3CE;"
| data-sort-value="0722.000" | 722
| data-sort-value="345.010" | 7.
| data-sort-value="1712-12-31" | 1708–1717
| chorale setting "Gelobet seist du, Jesu Christ"
| 
| Organ
| data-sort-value="000.40: 062" | 40: 62
| data-sort-value="IV/03: 031" | IV/3: 31
| data-sort-value="after BWV 0722a" | after BWV 722a
| 
|- style="background: #F6E3CE;"
| data-sort-value="0722.A00" | 722a
| data-sort-value="345.011" | 7.
| data-sort-value="1709-07-01" | 1709?
| chorale setting "Gelobet seist du, Jesu Christ" (sketch)
| 
| Organ
| data-sort-value="000.40: 158" | 40: 158
| data-sort-value="IV/03: 030" | IV/3: 30
| after Z 1947; → BWV 722
| 
|-
| data-sort-value="0723.000" | 723
| data-sort-value="345.012" | 7.
| data-sort-value="1708-12-31" | 1700–1717
| chorale setting "Gelobet seist du, Jesu Christ" (also in Neumeister Collection)
| 
| Organ
| data-sort-value="000.40: 063" | 40: 63
| 
| after Z 1947; by Bach, J. Michael?
| 
|- style="background: #F5F6CE;"
| data-sort-value="0724.000" rowspan="2" | 724
| data-sort-value="345.013" rowspan="2" | 7.
| data-sort-value="1699-07-01" rowspan="2" | 
| chorale setting "Gott durch deine Güte"
| rowspan="2" | 
| rowspan="2" | Organ
| data-sort-value="000.40: 065" rowspan="2" | 40: 65
| data-sort-value="IV/03: 033" rowspan="2" | IV/3: 33
| rowspan="2" | after Z 3294; in Andreas-Bach-Buch| rowspan="2" | 
|- style="background: #F5F6CE;"
| chorale setting "Gottes Sohn ist kommen"
|-
| data-sort-value="0725.000" | 725
| data-sort-value="345.014" | 7.
| data-sort-value="1708-12-31" | 1700–1717
| chorale setting "Herr Gott, dich loben wir"
| 
| Organ
| data-sort-value="000.40: 066" | 40: 66
| data-sort-value="IV/03: 036" | IV/3: 36
| after Z 8652
| 
|- style="background: #F6E3CE;"
| data-sort-value="0726.000" | 726
| data-sort-value="345.015" | 7.
| data-sort-value="1712-12-31" | 1708–1717
| chorale setting "Herr Jesu Christ, dich zu uns wend"
| 
| Organ
| data-sort-value="000.40: 072" | 40: 72
| data-sort-value="IV/03: 045" | IV/3: 45
| data-sort-value="after Z 0624" | after Z 624
| 
|- style="background: #F6E3CE;"
| data-sort-value="0727.000" | 727
| data-sort-value="345.016" | 7.
| data-sort-value="1712-12-31" | 1708–1717
| chorale setting "Herzlich tut mich verlangen"
| 
| Organ
| data-sort-value="000.40: 073" | 40: 73
| data-sort-value="IV/03: 046" | IV/3: 46
| after Z 5385a
| 
|- style="background: #E3F6CE;"
| data-sort-value="0728.000" | 728
| data-sort-value="345.017" | 7.
| data-sort-value="1722-12-31" | 1722–1723 or earlier
| data-sort-value="Notebook A. M. Bach (1722) No. 08" | Notebook A. M. Bach (1722) No. 8 chorale setting "Jesus, meine Zuversicht"
| 
| Organ
| data-sort-value="000.43 2: 005" | 432: 540: 74
| data-sort-value="V/04: 041" | V/4: 41IV/3: 58
| after Z 3432b
| 
|-
| data-sort-value="0729.000" | 729
| data-sort-value="346.001" | 7.
| data-sort-value="1712-12-31" | 1708–1717
| chorale setting "In dulci jubilo"
| 
| Organ
| data-sort-value="000.40: 075" | 40: 74
| data-sort-value="IV/03: 052" | IV/3: 52
| data-sort-value="after BWV 0729a" | after BWV 729a
| 
|- style="background: #F6E3CE;"
| data-sort-value="0729.A00" | 729a
| data-sort-value="346.002" | 7.
| data-sort-value="1712-12-31" | 1708–1717
| chorale setting "In dulci jubilo" (sketch)
| 
| Organ
| data-sort-value="000.40: 159" | 40: 158
| data-sort-value="IV/03: 050" | IV/3: 50
| after Z 4947; → BWV 729
| 
|-
| data-sort-value="0730.000" | 730
| data-sort-value="346.003" | 7.
| data-sort-value="1712-12-31" | 1708–1717
| chorale setting "Liebster Jesu, wir sind hier"
| 
| Organ
| data-sort-value="000.40: 076" | 40: 76
| data-sort-value="IV/03: 060" | IV/3: 60
| after Z 3498b
| 
|-
| data-sort-value="0731.000" | 731
| data-sort-value="346.004" | 7.
| data-sort-value="1712-12-31" | 1708–1717
| chorale setting "Liebster Jesu, wir sind hier"
| 
| Organ
| data-sort-value="000.40: 077" | 40: 77
| data-sort-value="IV/03: 061" | IV/3: 61
| after Z 3498b
| 
|-
| data-sort-value="0732.000" | 732
| data-sort-value="346.005" | 7.
| data-sort-value="1712-12-31" | 1708–1717
| chorale setting "Lobt Gott, ihr Christen, allzugleich"
| 
| Organ
| data-sort-value="000.40: 078" | 40: 78
| data-sort-value="IV/03: 064" | IV/3: 64
| data-sort-value="after BWV 0732a" | after BWV 732a
| 
|- style="background: #F6E3CE;"
| data-sort-value="0732.A00" | 732a
| data-sort-value="346.006" | 7.
| data-sort-value="1712-12-31" | 1708–1717
| chorale setting "Lobt Gott, ihr Christen, allzugleich" (draft)
| 
| Organ
| data-sort-value="000.40: 160" | 40: 159
| data-sort-value="IV/03: 063" | IV/3: 63
| data-sort-value="after Z 0198; → BWV 0732" | after Z 198; → BWV 732
| 
|-
| data-sort-value="0733.000" | 733
| data-sort-value="346.007" | 7.
| data-sort-value="1712-12-31" | 1708–1717
| chorale setting "Meine Seele erhebt den Herren" (fugue)
| 
| Organ
| data-sort-value="000.40: 079" | 40: 79
| data-sort-value="IV/03: 065" | IV/3: 65
| after Magnificat peregrini toni; by Krebs, J. L.?
| 
|-
| data-sort-value="0734.000" | 734
| data-sort-value="346.008" | 7.
| data-sort-value="1712-12-31" | 1708–1717
| chorale setting "Nun freut euch, lieben Christen g'mein"
| 
| Organ
| data-sort-value="000.40: 162" | 40: 160
| data-sort-value="IV/03: 070" | IV/3: 70
| after Z 4429a; → BWV 734a
| 
|-
| data-sort-value="0734.A00" | 734a
| data-sort-value="346.009" | 7.
| data-sort-value="1748-12-31" | 1708–1789
| chorale setting "Es ist gewisslich an der Zeit"
| 
| Organ
| data-sort-value="000.40: 084" | 40: 84
| IV/10
| data-sort-value="after BWV 0734" | after BWV 734; arr. by Scholz?
| 
|-
| data-sort-value="0735.000" | 735
| data-sort-value="346.010" | 7.
| data-sort-value="1708-12-31" | 1700–1717
| chorale setting "Valet will ich dir geben" (Fantasia)
| 
| Organ
| data-sort-value="000.40: 086" | 40: 86
| data-sort-value="IV/03: 077" | IV/3: 77
| data-sort-value="after BWV 0735a" | after BWV 735a
| 
|-
| data-sort-value="0735.A00" | 735a
| data-sort-value="346.011" | 7.
| data-sort-value="1706-07-01" | 1706
| chorale setting "Valet will ich dir geben" (early version)
| 
| Organ
| data-sort-value="000.40: 163" | 40: 161
| data-sort-value="IV/03: 081" | IV/3: 81
| after Z 5404a; → BWV 735
| 
|-
| data-sort-value="0736.000" | 736
| data-sort-value="346.012" | 7.
| data-sort-value="1715-07-01" | 1713–1717
| chorale setting "Valet will ich dir geben"
| 
| Org (V Bc)
| data-sort-value="000.40: 090" | 40: 90
| data-sort-value="IV/03: 084" | IV/3: 84
| after Z 5404a
| 
|- style="background: #F6E3CE;"
| data-sort-value="0737.000" | 737
| data-sort-value="346.013" | 7.
| data-sort-value="1704-07-01" | 1704
| chorale setting "Vater unser im Himmelreich" (Neumeister Chorales No. 18)
| 
| Organ
| data-sort-value="000.40: 096" | 40: 96
| data-sort-value="IV/09: 036" | IV/9: 36IV/3: 90
| after Z 2561
| 
|-
| data-sort-value="0738.000" | 738
| data-sort-value="346.014" | 7.
| data-sort-value="1712-12-31" | 1708–1717
| chorale setting "Vom Himmel hoch, da komm ich her"
| 
| Organ
| data-sort-value="000.40: 097" | 40: 97
| data-sort-value="IV/03: 094" | IV/3: 94
| data-sort-value="after BWV 0738a" | after BWV 738a
| 
|- style="background: #F6E3CE;"
| data-sort-value="0738.A00" | 738a
| data-sort-value="346.015" | 7.
| data-sort-value="1712-12-31" | 1708–1717
| chorale setting "Vom Himmel hoch, da komm ich her" (sketch)
| 
| Organ
| data-sort-value="000.40: 161" | 40: 159
| data-sort-value="IV/03: 094" | IV/3: 94
| data-sort-value="after Z 0346; → BWV 0738" | after Z 346; → BWV 738
| 
|- style="background: #E3F6CE;"
| data-sort-value="0739.000" | 739
| data-sort-value="346.016" | 7.
| data-sort-value="1704-07-01" | 1704
| chorale setting "Wie schön leuchtet der Morgenstern"
| 
| Organ
| data-sort-value="000.40: 099" | 40: 99
| data-sort-value="IV/10: 002" | IV/10: 2
| after Z 8359
| 
|-
| data-sort-value="0740.000" | 740
| data-sort-value="347.001" | 7.
| data-sort-value="1739-07-01" | 1700–1780
| chorale setting "Wir glauben all an einen Gott"
| 
| Organ
| data-sort-value="000.40: 103" | 40: 103
| 
| after Z 4000; by Krebs, J. L.? (Krebs‑WV 554c)
| 
|- style="background: #F6E3CE;"
| data-sort-value="0741.000" | 741
| data-sort-value="347.002" | 7.
| data-sort-value="1701-07-01" | 1701
| chorale setting "Ach Gott, vom Himmel sieh darein"
| 
| Organ
| data-sort-value="000.40: 167" | 40: 167
| data-sort-value="IV/03: 004" | IV/3: 4
| after Z 4431
| 
|-
| data-sort-value="0742.000" | 742
| data-sort-value="347.003" | 7.
| data-sort-value="1704-07-01" | 1704
|  (Neumeister Chorales No. 14)
| 
| Organ
| 
| data-sort-value="IV/09: 028" | IV/9: 28
| after Z 5385a
| 
|-
| data-sort-value="0743.000" | 743
| data-sort-value="347.004" | 7.
| data-sort-value="1708-12-31" | 1700–1717
| 
| 
| Organ
| 
| data-sort-value="IV/10: 011" | IV/10: 11
| after Z 1208b
| 
|- style="background: #F6E3CE;"
| data-sort-value="0744.000" | 744
| data-sort-value="347.005" | 7.
| data-sort-value="1708-12-31" | 1700–1717
| chorale setting "Auf meinen lieben Gott"
| 
| Organ
| data-sort-value="000.40: 170" | 40: 170
| data-sort-value="IV/10: 020" | IV/10: 20
| after Z 2164; by Krebs, J. L.? (Krebs‑WV 517)
| 
|-
| data-sort-value="0745.000" | 745
| data-sort-value="347.006" | 7.
| data-sort-value="1743-07-01" | 1700–1788
| chorale setting "Aus der Tiefe rufe ich"
| 
| Organ
| data-sort-value="000.40: 171" | 40: 171
| data-sort-value="IV/10: 022" | IV/10: 22
| after Z 1217; by Bach, C. P. E.?
| 
|-
| data-sort-value="0747.000" | 747
| data-sort-value="347.008" | 7.
| data-sort-value="1708-12-31" | 1700–1717
| 
| 
| Organ
| 
| data-sort-value="IV/10: 038" | IV/10: 38
| after Z 6283b
| 
|-
| data-sort-value="0749.000" | 749
| data-sort-value="347.011" | 7.
| data-sort-value="1708-12-31" | 1700–1717
| 
| 
| Organ
| 
| data-sort-value="IV/10: 080" | IV/10: 80
| data-sort-value="after Z 0624" | after Z 624; by Bach, J. Christoph or Telemann?
| 
|-
| data-sort-value="0750.000" | 750
| data-sort-value="347.012" | 7.
| data-sort-value="1701-12-31" | 1700–1703
| 
| 
| Organ
| 
| data-sort-value="IV/10: 081" | IV/10: 81
| 
| 
|-
| data-sort-value="0752.000" | 752
| data-sort-value="347.014" | 7.
| data-sort-value="1708-12-31" | 1700–1717
| 
| 
| Organ
| 
| 
| after Z 6779a
| 
|- style="background: #E3F6CE;"
| data-sort-value="0753.000" | 753
| data-sort-value="347.015" | 7.
| data-sort-value="1720-07-01" | 1720
| chorale setting "Jesu, meine Freude" (unfinished; WFB No. 5)
| 
| Organ
| data-sort-value="000.40: 164" | 40: 163451: 214
| data-sort-value="V/05: 008" | V/5: 8
| after Z 8032
| 
|-
| data-sort-value="0754.000" | 754
| data-sort-value="347.016" | 7.
| data-sort-value="1708-12-31" | 1700–1717
| 
| 
| Organ
| 
| 
| after Z 3498b
| 
|-
| data-sort-value="0755.000" | 755
| data-sort-value="347.017" | 7.
| data-sort-value="1708-12-31" | 1700–1717
| 
| 
| Organ
| 
| 
| after Z 4429a
| 
|-
| data-sort-value="0756.000" | 756
| data-sort-value="347.018" | 7.
| data-sort-value="1708-12-31" | 1700–1717
| 
| 
| Organ
| 
| 
| after Z 2293b
| 
|-
| data-sort-value="0757.000" | 757
| data-sort-value="347.019" | 7.
| data-sort-value="1708-12-31" | 1700–1717
| 
| 
| Organ
| 
| 
| after Z 5690
| 
|-
| data-sort-value="0758.000" | 758
| data-sort-value="347.020" | 7.
| data-sort-value="1708-12-31" | 1700–1717
| chorale setting "O Vater, allmächtiger Gott"
| 
| Organ
| data-sort-value="000.40: 179" | 40: 179
| data-sort-value="IV/11: 069" | IV/11: 69
| after Z 8603b
| 
|- style="background: #F6E3CE;"
| data-sort-value="0762.000" | 762
| data-sort-value="348.002" | 7.
| data-sort-value="1708-12-31" | 1700–1717
| 
| 
| Organ
| 
| IV/10: 142
| after Z 2561
| 
|-
| data-sort-value="0763.000" | 763
| data-sort-value="348.003" | 7.
| data-sort-value="1708-12-31" | 1700–1717
| 
| 
| Organ
| 
| 
| after Z 8359
| 
|- style="background: #E3F6CE;"
| data-sort-value="0764.000" | 764
| data-sort-value="348.004" | 7.
| data-sort-value="1704-12-31" | 1704–1705
| chorale setting "Wie schön leuchtet der Morgenstern"
| 
| Organ
| data-sort-value="000.40: 165" | 40: 164
| data-sort-value="IV/10: 006" | IV/10: 6
| after Z 8359
| 
|- style="background: #F6E3CE;"
| data-sort-value="0765.000" | 765
| data-sort-value="348.005" | 7.
| data-sort-value="1706-07-01" | 1706
| chorale setting "Wir glauben all an einen Gott"
| 
| Organ
| data-sort-value="000.40: 187" | 40: 187
| 
| after Z 7971
| 
|- style="background: #F6E3CE;"
| 1085
| data-sort-value="348.006" | 7.
| data-sort-value="1708-12-31" | 1700–1717
| 
| 
| Organ
| 
| data-sort-value="IV/03: 076" | IV/3: 76
| after Z 4361
| 
|-
| 1090
| data-sort-value="349.002" | 7.
| data-sort-value="1704-07-01" | 1704
| chorale setting "Wir Christenleut" (Neumeister Chorales No. 2)
| 
| Organ
| 
| data-sort-value="IV/09: 004" | IV/9: 4
| after Z 2072
| 
|-
| 1091
| data-sort-value="349.003" | 7.
| data-sort-value="1699-07-01" | 1699
| chorale setting "Das alte Jahr vergangen ist (Neumeister Chorales No. 3)
| 
| Organ
| 
| data-sort-value="IV/09: 006" | IV/9: 6
| data-sort-value="after Z 0381c" | after Z 381c
| 
|-
| 1092
| data-sort-value="349.004" | 7.
| data-sort-value="1701-07-01" | 1701
| chorale setting "Herr Gott, nun schleuß den Himmel auf" (Neumeister Chorales No. 4)
| 
| Organ
| 
| data-sort-value="IV/09: 008" | IV/9: 8
| after Z 7641b
| 
|-
| 1093
| data-sort-value="349.005" | 7.
| data-sort-value="1704-07-01" | 1704
| chorale setting "Herzliebster Jesu, was hast du verbrochen" (Neumeister Chorales No. 5)
| 
| Organ
| 
| data-sort-value="IV/09: 010" | IV/9: 10
| data-sort-value="after Z 0983" | after Z 983
| 
|-
| 1094
| data-sort-value="349.006" | 7.
| data-sort-value="1699-07-01" | 1699
| chorale setting "O Jesu, wie ist dein Gestalt" (Neumeister Chorales No. 6)
| 
| Organ
| 
| data-sort-value="IV/09: 012" | IV/9: 12
| after Z 8360
| 
|-
| 1095
| data-sort-value="349.007" | 7.
| data-sort-value="1704-07-01" | 1704
| chorale setting "O Lamm Gottes unschuldig" (Neumeister Chorales No. 7)
| 
| Organ
| 
| data-sort-value="IV/09: 014" | IV/9: 14
| after Z 4361a
| 
|-
| 1097
| data-sort-value="349.009" | 7.
| data-sort-value="1699-07-01" | 1699
| chorale setting "Ehre sei dir Christe, der du leidest Not" (Neumeister Chorales No. 9)
| 
| Organ
| 
| data-sort-value="IV/09: 018" | IV/9: 18
| after Z 8187h
| 
|-
| 1098
| data-sort-value="349.010" | 7.
| data-sort-value="1704-07-01" | 1704
| chorale setting "Wir glauben all an einen Gott" (Neumeister Chorales No. 10)
| 
| Organ
| 
| data-sort-value="IV/09: 020" | IV/9: 20
| after Z 7971
| 
|-
| 1099
| data-sort-value="349.011" | 7.
| data-sort-value="1701-07-01" | 1701
| chorale setting "Aus tiefer Not schrei ich zu dir" (Neumeister Chorales No. 11)
| 
| Organ
| 
| data-sort-value="IV/09: 022" | IV/9: 22
| after Z 4438
| 
|-
| 1100
| data-sort-value="349.012" | 7.
| data-sort-value="1704-07-01" | 1704
| chorale setting "Allein zu dir, Herr Jesu Christ" (Neumeister Chorales No. 12)
| 
| Organ
| 
| data-sort-value="IV/09: 024" | IV/9: 24
| after Z 7292b
| 
|-
| 1101
| data-sort-value="349.015" | 7.
| data-sort-value="1704-07-01" | 1704
| chorale setting "Durch Adams Fall ist ganz verderbt" (Neumeister Chorales No. 15)
| 
| Organ
| 
| data-sort-value="IV/09: 030" | IV/9: 30
| after Z 7549
| 
|-
| 1102
| data-sort-value="349.016" | 7.
| data-sort-value="1706-07-01" | 1706
| chorale setting "Du Friedefürst, Herr Jesu Christ" (Neumeister Chorales No. 16)
| 
| Organ
| 
| data-sort-value="IV/09: 033" | IV/9: 33
| after Z 4373
| 
|-
| 1103
| data-sort-value="349.016" | 7.
| data-sort-value="1703-07-01" | 1699–1709
| chorale setting "Erhalt uns Herr, bei deinem Wort" (Neumeister Chorales No. 17)
| 
| Organ
| 
| data-sort-value="IV/09: 035" | IV/9: 35
| data-sort-value="after Z 0350" | after Z 350
| 
|-
| 1104
| data-sort-value="350.001" | 7.
| data-sort-value="1703-07-01" | 1699–1709
| chorale setting "Wenn dich Unglück tut greifen an" (Neumeister Chorales No. 19)
| 
| Organ
| 
| data-sort-value="IV/09: 038" | IV/9: 38
| data-sort-value="after Z 0499" | after Z 499
| 
|-
| 1105
| data-sort-value="350.002" | 7.
| data-sort-value="1701-07-01" | 1701
| chorale setting "Jesu, meine Freude" (Neumeister Chorales No. 20)
| 
| Organ
| 
| data-sort-value="IV/09: 039" | IV/9: 39
| after Z 8032
| 
|-
| 1106
| data-sort-value="350.003" | 7.
| data-sort-value="1704-07-01" | 1704
| chorale setting "Gott ist mein Heil, mein Hilf und Trost" (Neumeister Chorales No. 21)
| 
| Organ
| 
| data-sort-value="IV/09: 040" | IV/9: 40
| after Z 4421
| 
|-
| 1107
| data-sort-value="350.004" | 7.
| data-sort-value="1704-07-01" | 1704
| chorale setting "Jesu, meines Lebens Leben" (Neumeister Chorales No. 22)
| 
| Organ
| 
| data-sort-value="IV/09: 042" | IV/9: 42
| after Z 6794
| 
|-
| 1108
| data-sort-value="350.005" | 7.
| data-sort-value="1704-07-01" | 1704
| chorale setting "Als Jesus Christus in der Nacht" (Neumeister Chorales No. 23)
| 
| Organ
| 
| data-sort-value="IV/09: 044" | IV/9: 44
| data-sort-value="after Z 0258" | after Z 258
| 
|-
| 1109
| data-sort-value="350.006" | 7.
| data-sort-value="1703-07-01" | 1699–1709
| chorale setting "Ach Gott, tu dich erbarmen" (Neumeister Chorales No. 24)
| 
| Organ
| 
| data-sort-value="IV/09: 046" | IV/9: 46
| after Z 7228c
| 
|-
| 1110
| data-sort-value="350.007" | 7.
| data-sort-value="1704-07-01" | 1704
| chorale setting "O Herre Gott, dein göttlich Wort" (Neumeister Chorales No. 25)
| 
| Organ
| 
| data-sort-value="IV/09: 048" | IV/9: 48
| after Z 5690
| 
|-
| 1111
| data-sort-value="350.008" | 7.
| data-sort-value="1701-07-01" | 1701
| chorale setting "Nun lasset uns den Leib begraben" (Neumeister Chorales No. 26)
| 
| Organ
| 
| data-sort-value="IV/09: 050" | IV/9: 50
| data-sort-value="after Z 0352" | after Z 352
| 
|-
| 1112
| data-sort-value="350.009" | 7.
| data-sort-value="1699-07-01" | 1699
| chorale setting "Christus, der ist mein Leben" (Neumeister Chorales No. 27)
| 
| Organ
| 
| data-sort-value="IV/09: 052" | IV/9: 52
| data-sort-value="after Z 0132" | after Z 132
| 
|-
| 1113
| data-sort-value="350.010" | 7.
| data-sort-value="1699-07-01" | 1699
| chorale setting "Ich hab mein Sach Gott heimgestellt" (Neumeister Chorales No. 28)
| 
| Organ
| 
| data-sort-value="IV/09: 054" | IV/9: 54
| after Z 1679
| 
|-
| 1114
| data-sort-value="350.011" | 7.
| data-sort-value="1701-07-01" | 1701
| chorale setting "Herr Jesu Christ, du höchstes Gut" (Neumeister Chorales No. 29)
| 
| Organ
| 
| data-sort-value="IV/09: 056" | IV/9: 56
| after Z 4486
| 
|-
| 1115
| data-sort-value="350.012" | 7.
| data-sort-value="1701-07-01" | 1701
| chorale setting "Herzlich lieb hab ich dich, o Herr" (Neumeister Chorales No. 30)
| 
| Organ
| 
| data-sort-value="IV/09: 058" | IV/9: 58
| after Z 8326
| 
|-
| 1116
| data-sort-value="350.013" | 7.
| data-sort-value="1701-07-01" | 1701
| chorale setting "Was Gott tut, das ist wohlgetan" (Neumeister Chorales No. 31)
| 
| Organ
| 
| data-sort-value="IV/09: 060" | IV/9: 60
| after Z 5629
| 
|-
| 1117
| data-sort-value="350.014" | 7.
| data-sort-value="1701-07-01" | 1701
| chorale setting "Alle Menschen müssen sterben" (Neumeister Chorales No. 32)
| 
| Organ
| 
| data-sort-value="IV/09: 062" | IV/9: 62
| after Z 6779a
| 
|-
| 1118
| data-sort-value="350.016" | 7.
| data-sort-value="1701-07-01" | 1701
| chorale setting "Werde munter, mein Gemüte" (Neumeister Chorales No. 34)
| 
| Organ
| 
| data-sort-value="IV/09: 066" | IV/9: 66
| after Z 6551
| 
|-
| 1119
| data-sort-value="350.017" | 7.
| data-sort-value="1699-07-01" | 1699
| chorale setting "Wie nach einer Wasserquelle" (Neumeister Chorales No. 35)
| 
| Organ
| 
| data-sort-value="IV/09: 068" | IV/9: 68
| after Z 1294
| 
|-
| 1120
| data-sort-value="350.018" | 7.
| data-sort-value="1704-07-01" | 1704
| chorale setting "Christ, der du bist der helle Tag" (Neumeister Chorales No. 36)
| 
| Organ
| 
| data-sort-value="IV/09: 070" | IV/9: 70
| data-sort-value="after Z 0384" | after Z 384
| 
|-
| data-sort-value="0957.000" | 957
| data-sort-value="351.002" | 7.
| data-sort-value="1701-07-01" | 1701
| chorale setting "Machs mit mir, Gott, nach deiner Güt" (Neumeister Chorales No. 33; a.k.a. Fugue = first half in later arr.)
| G maj.
| Organ
| data-sort-value="000.42: 203" | 42: 203
| data-sort-value="IV/09: 064" | IV/9: 64, 74
| after Z 2383
| 
|-
| data-sort-value="0766.000" | 766
| data-sort-value="351.003" | 7.
| data-sort-value="1706-07-01" | 1706
| chorale setting "Christ, der du bist der helle Tag"
| 
| Organ
| data-sort-value="000.40: 107" | 40: 107
| data-sort-value="IV/01: 114" | IV/1: 114
| data-sort-value="after Z 0384" | after Z 384
| 
|-
| data-sort-value="0767.000" | 767
| data-sort-value="352.002" | 7.
| data-sort-value="1708-07-01" | 1708
| chorale setting "O Gott, du frommer Gott"
| 
| Organ
| data-sort-value="000.40: 114" | 40: 114
| data-sort-value="IV/01: 122" | IV/1: 122
| after Z 5138
| 
|- style="background: #F6E3CE;"
| data-sort-value="0768.000" | 768
| data-sort-value="353.001" | 7.
| data-sort-value="1712-12-31" | 1708–1717 or earlier
| chorale setting "Sei gegrüßet, Jesu gütig"
| 
| Organ
| data-sort-value="000.40: 122" | 40: 122
| data-sort-value="IV/01: 132" | IV/1: 132, 152
| after Z 3889b
| 
|- style="background: #E3F6CE;"
| data-sort-value="0769.000" | 769
| data-sort-value="354.001" | 7.
| data-sort-value="1747-12-31" | 1747–1748
| chorale setting "Vom Himmel hoch da komm ich her'" (canonic variations; print version)
| 
| Organ
| data-sort-value="000.40: 137" | 40: 137
| data-sort-value="IV/02: 197" | IV/2: 197
| data-sort-value="after Z 0346; → BWV 0769a" | after Z 346; → BWV 769a
| 
|- style="background: #E3F6CE;"
| data-sort-value="0769.A00" | 769a
| data-sort-value="354.002" | 7.
| data-sort-value="1748-01-01" | 1747–1748
| chorale setting "Vom Himmel hoch da komm ich her" (canonic variations; autograph)
| 
| Organ
| 
| data-sort-value="IV/02: 098" | IV/2: 98
| data-sort-value="after BWV 0769" | after BWV 769
| 
|- style="background: #F6E3CE;"
| data-sort-value="0770.000" | 770
| data-sort-value="354.003" | 7.
| data-sort-value="1704-07-01" | 1704
| chorale setting "Ach, was soll ich Sünder machen"
| 
| Organ
| data-sort-value="000.40: 189" | 40: 189
| data-sort-value="IV/01: 104" | IV/1: 104
| after Z 3574
| 
|}

BWV Anhang
Various lost, doubtful and spurious organ works are included in the BWV Anhang:
 BWV Anh. 42–79
 BWV Anh. 171–178
 BWV Anh. 200, 206, 208, 213

References

Sources
 
 
 Jean M. Perreault, edited by and Donna K. Fitch. The Thematic Catalogue of the Musical Works of Johann Pachelbel. Lanham, Maryland: Scarecrow Press, 2004. 
 Terry, Charles Sanford (1921). Bach's Chorals – Part III: The Hymns and Hymn Melodies of the Organ Works. Cambridge University Press.

External links

 . Accessed: 09:23, 3 April 2016 (UTC).
 James Kibbie - Bach Organ Works: free downloads of the complete organ works of Johann Sebastian Bach, recorded by Dr. James Kibbie on original baroque organs in Germany. Accessed: 09:23, 3 April 2016 (UTC).

 
Organ compositions by Johann Sebastian Bach, List of
Bach, Johann Sebastian, List of organ compositions by
Articles containing video clips